The following is a list of players, both past and current, who appeared in at least one regular season or playoff game for the Boston Celtics NBA franchise.



Players
Note: Statistics are correct through the end of the  season.

A to B

|-
|align="left"| || align="center"|F/C || align="left"|Duke || align="center"|2 || align="center"|– || 76 || 1,311 || 346 || 20 || 578 || 17.3 || 4.6 || 0.3 || 7.6 || align=center|
|-
|align="left"| || align="center"|F/C || align="left"|Iowa State || align="center"|1 || align="center"| || 2 || 24 || 15 || 3 || 8 || 12.0 || 7.5 || 1.5 || 4.0 || align=center|
|-
|align="left"| || align="center"|F/C || align="left"|Oral Roberts || align="center"|2 || align="center"|– || 141 || 1,783 || 416 || 61 || 424 || 12.6 || 3.0 || 0.4 || 3.0 || align=center|
|-
|align="left" bgcolor="#FFCC00"|+ || align="center"|G || align="left"|BYU || align="center"|8 || align="center"|– || 556 || 15,603 || 1,534 || 2,422 || 6,257 || 28.1 || 2.8 || 4.4 || 11.3 || align=center|
|-
|align="left"| || align="center"|G || align="left"|Arizona || align="center"|1 || align="center"| || 18 || 107 || 11 || 12 || 19 || 5.9 || 0.6 || 0.7 || 1.1 || align=center|
|-
|align="left" bgcolor="#FFFF99"|^ || align="center"|G || align="left"|UConn || align="center"|5 || align="center"|– || 358 || 12,774 || 1,215 || 981 || 5,987 || 35.7 || 3.4 || 2.7 || 16.7 || align=center|
|-
|align="left"| || align="center"|G/F || align="left"|Oklahoma State || align="center"|6 || align="center"|– || 336 || 6,194 || 873 || 439 || 2,423 || 18.4 || 2.6 || 1.3 || 7.2 || align=center|
|-
|align="left"| || align="center"|G || align="left"|West Virginia || align="center"|1 || align="center"| || 22 || 126 || 13 || 6 || 61 || 5.7 || 0.6 || 0.3 || 2.8 || align=center|
|-
|align="left"| || align="center"|G || align="left"|Georgia Tech || align="center"|5 || align="center"|– || 241 || 7,268 || 715 || 1,250 || 2,717 || 30.2 || 3.0 || 5.2 || 11.3 || align=center|
|-
|align="left"| || align="center"|C || align="left"|UNLV || align="center"|1 || align="center"| || 21 || 149 || 31 || 2 || 22 || 7.1 || 1.5 || 0.1 || 1.0 || align=center|
|-
|align="left" bgcolor="#FFFF99"|^ || align="center"|G || align="left"|UTEP || align="center"|5 || align="center"|– || 363 || 11,324 || 683 || 2,563 || 4,550 || 31.2 || 1.9 || 7.1 || 12.5 || align=center|
|-
|align="left"| || align="center"|F/C || align="left"|Cincinnati || align="center"|4 || align="center"|– || 204 || 2,550 || 788 || 142 || 753 || 12.5 || 3.9 || 0.7 || 3.7 || align=center|
|-
|align="left"| || align="center"|G || align="left"|FIU || align="center"|1 || align="center"| || 15 || 190 || 23 || 25 || 36 || 12.7 || 1.5 || 1.7 || 2.4 || align=center|
|-
|align="left"| || align="center"|G || align="left"|South Florida || align="center"|1 || align="center"| || 24 || 793 || 45 || 128 || 289 || 33.0 || 1.9 || 5.3 || 12.0 || align=center|
|-
|align="left"| || align="center"|C || align="left"|Santa Clara || align="center"|1 || align="center"| || 23 || 247 || 47 || 20 || 50 || 10.7 || 2.0 || 0.9 || 2.2 || align=center|
|-
|align="left"| || align="center"|G || align="left"|Iowa State || align="center"|1 || align="center"| || 14 || 132 || 17 || 3 || 22 || 9.4 || 1.2 || 0.2 || 1.6 || align=center|
|-
|align="left"| || align="center"|G/F || align="left"|Fordham || align="center"|1 || align="center"| || 34 ||  ||  || 25 || 119 ||  ||  || 0.7 || 3.5 || align=center|
|-
|align="left"| || align="center"|G || align="left"|Boston College || align="center"|3 || align="center"|– || 137 || 2,934 || 257 || 796 || 777 || 21.4 || 1.9 || 5.8 || 5.7 || align=center|
|-
|align="left"| || align="center"|F || align="left"|Hartford || align="center"|2 || align="center"|– || 89 || 1,942 || 408 || 83 || 688 || 21.8 || 4.6 || 0.9 || 7.7 || align=center|
|-
|align="left"| || align="center"|G || align="left"|UNLV || align="center"|3 || align="center"|– || 180 || 2,799 || 278 || 362 || 951 || 15.6 || 1.5 || 2.0 || 5.3 || align=center|
|-
|align="left"| || align="center"|G || align="left"| Bauru Basket || align="center"|1 || align="center"| || 41 || 513 || 46 || 58 || 215 || 12.5 || 1.1 || 1.4 || 5.2 || align=center|
|-
|align="left"| || align="center"|F/C || align="left"|Hawaii || align="center"|1 || align="center"| || 12 || 131 || 30 || 6 || 53 || 10.9 || 2.5 || 0.5 || 4.4 || align=center|
|-
|align="left" bgcolor="#FFFF99"|^ || align="center"|F/C || align="left"|UCLA || align="center"|2 || align="center"|– || 135 || 3,148 || 890 || 246 || 1,215 || 23.3 || 6.6 || 1.8 || 9.0 || align=center|
|-
|align="left"| || align="center"|F/C || align="left"|UTEP || align="center"|2 || align="center"|– || 126 || 1,644 || 544 || 79 || 700 || 13.0 || 4.3 || 0.6 || 5.6 || align=center|
|-
|align="left"| || align="center"|F/C || align="left"|Providence || align="center"|1 || align="center"| || 38 || 796 || 177 || 53 || 309 || 20.9 || 4.7 || 1.4 || 8.1 || align=center|
|-
|align="left"| || align="center"|G/F || align="left"|Oregon || align="center"|1 || align="center"| || 48 || 383 || 53 || 41 || 198 || 8.0 || 1.1 || 0.9 || 4.1 || align=center|
|-
|align="left"| || align="center"|G/F || align="left"|Kansas State || align="center"|2 || align="center"| || 131 || 2,092 || 343 || 229 || 641 || 16.0 || 2.6 || 1.7 || 4.9 || align=center|
|-
|align="left"| || align="center"|G || align="left"|Boston College || align="center"|6 || align="center"|– || 307 || 7,028 || 597 || 1,014 || 3,109 || 22.9 || 1.9 || 3.3 || 10.1 || align=center|
|-
|align="left"| || align="center"|F || align="left"|LSU || align="center"|4 || align="center"|– || 304 || 8,302 || 1,658 || 330 || 3,216 || 27.3 || 5.5 || 1.1 || 10.6 || align=center|
|-
|align="left"| || align="center"|F/C || align="left"|Texas Tech || align="center"|6 || align="center"|– || 336 || 7,474 || 1,975 || 237 || 2,269 || 22.2 || 5.9 || 0.7 || 6.8 || align=center|
|-
|align="left"| || align="center"|F || align="left"|Illinois || align="center"|2 || align="center"|– || 11 || 75 || 20 || 2 || 28 || 6.8 || 1.8 || 0.2 || 2.5 || align=center|
|-
|align="left"| || align="center"|G || align="left"|Arizona || align="center"|1 || align="center"| || 41 || 1,036 || 86 || 128 || 416 || 25.3 || 2.1 || 3.1 || 10.1 || align=center|
|-
|align="left"| || align="center"|C || align="left"|Washington State || align="center"|2 || align="center"|– || 132 || 2,306 || 674 || 150 || 766 || 17.5 || 5.1 || 1.1 || 5.8 || align=center|
|-
|align="left"| || align="center"|G/F || align="left"|Duquesne || align="center"|1 || align="center"| || 6 ||  ||  || 1 || 13 ||  ||  || 0.2 || 2.2 || align=center|
|-
|align="left"| || align="center"|F/C || align="left"|LIU Brooklyn || align="center"|1 || align="center"| || 8 ||  ||  || 3 || 19 ||  ||  || 0.4 || 2.4 || align=center|
|-
|align="left"| || align="center"|G/F || align="left"|Penn || align="center"|1 || align="center"| || 4 || 17 || 4 || 0 || 6 || 4.3 || 1.0 || 0.0 || 1.5 || align=center|
|-
|align="left"| || align="center"|G || align="left"|Colorado || align="center"|1 || align="center"| || 51 || 1,296 || 113 || 217 || 565 || 25.4 || 2.2 || 4.3 || 11.1 || align=center|
|-
|align="left" bgcolor="#FFFF99"|^ || align="center"|G || align="left"|Syracuse || align="center"|1 || align="center"| || 80 || 2,256 || 212 || 300 || 1,088 || 28.2 || 2.7 || 3.8 || 13.6 || align=center|
|-
|align="left"| || align="center"|G || align="left"|California || align="center"|1 || align="center"| || 13 || 115 || 19 || 8 || 39 || 8.8 || 1.5 || 0.6 || 3.0 || align=center|
|-
|align="left" bgcolor="#FFFF99"|^ (#33) || align="center"|F || align="left"|Indiana State || align="center"|13 || align="center"|– || 897 || 34,443 || 8,974 || 5,695 || 21,791 || 38.4 || 10.0 || 6.3 || 24.3 || align=center|
|-
|align="left"| || align="center"|G || align="left"|Houston || align="center"|1 || align="center"| || 13 || 108 || 13 || 9 || 37 || 8.3 || 1.0 || 0.7 || 2.8 || align=center|
|-
|align="left"| || align="center"|G || align="left"|Dartmouth || align="center"|1 || align="center"| || 9 || 61 || 8 || 6 || 14 || 6.8 || 0.9 || 0.7 || 1.6 || align=center|
|-
|align="left"| || align="center"|F/C || align="left"|Temple || align="center"|1 || align="center"| || 14 ||  ||  || 14 || 129 ||  ||  || 1.0 || 9.2 || align=center|
|-
|align="left"| || align="center"|C || align="left"|Pittsburgh || align="center"|6 || align="center"|– || 338 || 7,646 || 1,589 || 333 || 2,561 || 22.6 || 4.7 || 1.0 || 7.6 || align=center|
|-
|align="left"| || align="center"|G || align="left"|Marquette || align="center"|1 || align="center"| || 3 || 15 || 3 || 1 || 5 || 5.0 || 1.0 || 0.3 || 1.7 || align=center|
|-
|align="left"| || align="center"|G/F || align="left"|Kentucky || align="center"|1 || align="center"| || 6 || 55 || 3 || 3 || 12 || 9.2 || 0.5 || 0.5 || 2.0 || align=center|
|-
|align="left"| || align="center"|F || align="left"|Cincinnati || align="center"|2 || align="center"|– || 76 || 681 || 113 || 30 || 478 || 9.0 || 1.5 || 0.4 || 6.3 || align=center|
|-
|align="left"| || align="center"|F/C || align="left"|South Carolina || align="center"|3 || align="center"|– || 170 || 2,507 || 665 || 172 || 1,005 || 14.7 || 3.9 || 1.0 || 5.9 || align=center|
|-
|align="left"| || align="center"|F || align="left"|Cal State Fullerton || align="center"|2 || align="center"|– || 91 || 1,799 || 226 || 109 || 410 || 19.8 || 2.5 || 1.2 || 4.5 || align=center|
|-
|align="left"| || align="center"|C || align="left"|St. John's || align="center"|1 || align="center"| || 32 ||  || 135 || 40 || 201 ||  || 4.2 || 1.3 || 6.3 || align=center|
|-
|align="left"| || align="center"|G || align="left"|Texas || align="center"|7 || align="center"|– || 413 || 11,619 || 1,264 || 703 || 5,008 || 28.1 || 3.1 || 1.7 || 12.1 || align=center|
|-
|align="left"| || align="center"|G || align="left"|Wyoming || align="center"|2 || align="center"|– || 102 || 871 || 116 || 50 || 336 || 8.5 || 1.1 || 0.5 || 3.3 || align=center|
|-
|align="left"| || align="center"|F/C || align="left"|Michigan State || align="center"|4 || align="center"|– || 279 || 6,576 || 1,944 || 494 || 1,742 || 23.6 || 7.0 || 1.8 || 6.2 || align=center|
|-
|align="left" bgcolor="#FFFF99"|^ || align="center"|G/F || align="left"|Colgate || align="center"|1 || align="center"| || 48 || 414 || 50 || 71 || 176 || 8.6 || 1.0 || 1.5 || 3.7 || align=center|
|-
|align="left"| || align="center"|G || align="left"|St. Bonaventure || align="center"|1 || align="center"| || 64 || 1,503 || 145 || 164 || 528 || 23.5 || 2.3 || 2.6 || 8.3 || align=center|
|-
|align="left"| || align="center"|F/C || align="left"|Penn State || align="center"|1 || align="center"| || 17 || 255 || 34 || 15 || 81 || 15.0 || 2.0 || 0.9 || 4.8 || align=center|
|-
|align="left"| || align="center"|F || align="left"|Charleston || align="center"|1 || align="center"| || 58 ||  ||  || 60 || 567 ||  ||  || 1.0 || 9.8 || align=center|
|-
|align="left"| || align="center"|G/F || align="left"|Providence || align="center"|1 || align="center"| || 10 || 73 || 19 || 4 || 31 || 7.3 || 1.9 || 0.4 || 3.1 || align=center|
|-
|align="left"| || align="center"|G || align="left"|Jacksonville || align="center"|8 || align="center"|– || 476 || 13,665 || 1,302 || 1,883 || 5,512 || 28.7 || 2.7 || 4.0 || 11.6 || align=center|
|-
|align="left" bgcolor="#CCFFCC"|x || align="center"|G/F || align="left"|California || align="center"|3 || align="center"|– || 222 || 5,406 || 879 || 278 || 2,496 || 24.4 || 4.0 || 1.3 || 11.2 || align=center|
|-
|align="left"| || align="center"|G || align="left"|Northwest Florida State || align="center"|3 || align="center"|– || 101 || 1,319 || 258 || 60 || 318 || 13.1 || 2.6 || 0.6 || 3.1 || align=center|
|-
|align="left"| || align="center"|F/C || align="left"|Louisiana Tech || align="center"|1 || align="center"| || 18 || 209 || 68 || 10 || 39 || 11.6 || 3.8 || 0.6 || 2.2 || align=center|
|-
|align="left"| || align="center"|G || align="left"|New Mexico State || align="center"|2 || align="center"|– || 55 || 1,244 || 99 || 156 || 223 || 22.6 || 1.8 || 2.8 || 4.1 || align=center|
|-
|align="left"| || align="center"|G || align="left"|Temple || align="center"|1 || align="center"| || 7 || 142 || 9 || 24 || 26 || 20.3 || 1.3 || 3.4 || 3.7 || align=center|
|-
|align="left"| || align="center"|G || align="left"|DePaul || align="center"|2 || align="center"|– || 151 || 3,005 || 461 || 407 || 1,014 || 19.9 || 3.1 || 2.7 || 6.7 || align=center|
|-
|align="left"| || align="center"|F/C || align="left"|Seton Hall || align="center"|1 || align="center"| || 2 || 9 || 2 || 1 || 0 || 4.5 || 1.0 || 0.5 || 0.0 || align=center|
|-
|align="left"| || align="center"|G || align="left"|Indiana || align="center"|3 || align="center"|– || 226 || 3,672 || 411 || 637 || 1,074 || 16.2 || 1.8 || 2.8 || 4.8 || align=center|
|-
|align="left"| || align="center"|F || align="left"|Virginia || align="center"|1 || align="center"| || 61 || 495 || 109 || 15 || 189 || 8.1 || 1.8 || 0.2 || 3.1 || align=center|
|-
|align="left"| || align="center"|G || align="left"|Niagara || align="center"|1 || align="center"| || 5 || 47 || 13 || 4 || 31 || 9.4 || 2.6 || 0.8 || 6.2 || align=center|
|}

C

|-
|align="left"| || align="center"|G || align="left"|Virginia || align="center"|3 || align="center"|– || 157 || 1,236 || 128 || 164 || 346 || 7.9 || 0.8 || 1.0 || 2.2 || align=center|
|-
|align="left"| || align="center"|G || align="left"|Southern Illinois || align="center"|1 || align="center"| || 35 || 309 || 44 || 11 || 169 || 8.8 || 1.3 || 0.3 || 4.8 || align=center|
|-
|align="left"| || align="center"|G/F || align="left"|Guilford || align="center"|6 || align="center"|– || 363 || 5,810 || 818 || 484 || 2,285 || 16.0 || 2.3 || 1.3 || 6.3 || align=center|
|-
|align="left"| || align="center"|G || align="left"|Florida State || align="center"|1 || align="center"| || 17 || 299 || 31 || 35 || 130 || 17.6 || 1.8 || 2.1 || 7.6 || align=center|
|-
|align="left"| || align="center"|G || align="left"|Houston || align="center"|10 || align="center"|–– || 652 || 14,865 || 2,572 || 1,268 || 5,689 || 22.8 || 3.9 || 1.9 || 8.7 || align=center|
|-
|align="left"| || align="center"|G/F || align="left"|Indiana || align="center"|1 || align="center"| || 67 || 1,309 || 138 || 80 || 267 || 19.5 || 2.1 || 1.2 || 4.0 || align=center|
|-
|align="left"| || align="center"|G || align="left"|Ole Miss || align="center"|2 || align="center"|– || 93 || 689 || 86 || 65 || 223 || 7.4 || 0.9 || 0.7 || 2.4 || align=center|
|-
|align="left"| || align="center"|F || align="left"|Arkansas || align="center"|1 || align="center"| || 3 || 6 || 1 || 0 || 6 || 2.0 || 0.3 || 0.0 || 2.0 || align=center|
|-
|align="left"| || align="center"|C || align="left"|Georgia || align="center"|1 || align="center"| || 3 || 7 || 2 || 0 || 2 || 2.3 || 0.7 || 0.0 || 0.7 || align=center|
|-
|align="left"| || align="center"|F || align="left"|Florida State || align="center"|1 || align="center"| || 25 || 157 || 41 || 5 || 69 || 6.3 || 1.6 || 0.2 || 2.8 || align=center|
|-
|align="left"| || align="center"|G || align="left"|Virginia Tech || align="center"|1 || align="center"| || 14 || 175 || 11 || 16 || 52 || 12.5 || 0.8 || 1.1 || 3.7 || align=center|
|-
|align="left"| || align="center"|C || align="left"|Stanford || align="center"|1 || align="center"| || 32 || 330 || 52 || 6 || 37 || 10.3 || 1.6 || 0.2 || 1.2 || align=center|
|-
|align="left"| || align="center"|F/C || align="left"|Washington State || align="center"|4 || align="center"|– || 235 || 3,696 || 1,587 || 110 || 1,247 || 15.7 || 6.8 || 0.5 || 5.3 || align=center|
|-
|align="left"| || align="center"|F/C || align="left"|Providence || align="center"|1 || align="center"| || 74 || 1,614 || 323 || 104 || 574 || 21.8 || 4.4 || 1.4 || 7.8 || align=center|
|-
|align="left"| || align="center"|F/C || align="left"|Seton Hall || align="center"|2 || align="center"|– || 53 ||  ||  || 41 || 239 ||  ||  || 0.8 || 4.5 || align=center|
|-
|align="left"| || align="center"|F || align="left"|Kansas || align="center"|1 || align="center"| || 25 || 138 || 27 || 5 || 63 || 5.5 || 1.1 || 0.2 || 2.5 || align=center|
|-
|align="left" bgcolor="#FFFF99"|^ || align="center"|F || align="left"|Duquesne || align="center"|4 || align="center"|– || 272 || 5,071 || 1,807 || 494 || 1,850 || 24.6 || 6.6 || 1.8 || 6.8 || align=center|
|-
|align="left"| || align="center"|G || align="left"|NC State || align="center"|1 || align="center"| || 51 || 467 || 44 || 86 || 117 || 9.2 || 0.9 || 1.7 || 2.3 || align=center|
|-
|align="left"| || align="center"|F/C || align="left"|Oregon State || align="center"|2 || align="center"|– || 121 || 1,593 || 697 || 69 || 820 || 13.2 || 5.8 || 0.6 || 6.8 || align=center|
|-
|align="left" bgcolor="#FFFF99"|^ (#14) || align="center"|G || align="left"|Holy Cross || align="center"|13 || align="center"|– || 917 || 30,131 || 4,781 || bgcolor="#CFECEC"|6,945 || 16,955 || 35.5 || 5.2 || 7.6 || 18.5 || align=center|
|-
|align="left" bgcolor="#FFFF99"|^ (#18) || align="center"|F/C || align="left"|Florida State || align="center"|10 || align="center"|– || 726 || 28,551 || 10,170 || 2,828 || 13,192 || 39.3 || 14.0 || 3.9 || 18.2 || align=center|
|-
|align="left"| || align="center"|G || align="left"|Xavier || align="center"|2 || align="center"|– || 66 || 1,780 || 194 || 292 || 782 || 27.0 || 2.9 || 4.4 || 11.8 || align=center|
|-
|align="left"| || align="center"|F || align="left"|Iowa State || align="center"|1 || align="center"| || 4 ||  ||  || 0 || 6 ||  ||  || 0.0 || 1.5 || align=center|
|-
|align="left"| || align="center"|F || align="left"|Marquette || align="center"|3 || align="center"|– || 202 || 6,025 || 1,052 || 372 || 2,576 || 29.8 || 5.2 || 1.8 || 12.8 || align=center|
|}

D

|-
|align="left"| || align="center"|G/F || align="left"|Auburn || align="center"|3 || align="center"|– || 138 || 2,359 || 274 || 177 || 680 || 17.1 || 2.0 || 1.3 || 4.9 || align=center|
|-
|align="left"| || align="center"|F || align="left"| Virtus Roma || align="center"|1 || align="center"| || 18 || 192 || 25 || 7 || 94 || 10.7 || 1.4 || 0.4 || 5.2 || align=center|
|-
|align="left"| || align="center"|F/C || align="left"|LSU || align="center"|4 || align="center"|– || 277 || 5,808 || 1,139 || 224 || 2,098 || 21.0 || 4.1 || 0.8 || 7.6 || align=center|
|-
|align="left"| || align="center"|G || align="left"|Iowa || align="center"|3 || align="center"|– || 181 || 6,121 || 673 || 615 || 2,940 || 33.8 || 3.7 || 3.4 || 16.2 || align=center|
|-
|align="left"| || align="center"|F || align="left"|Florida State || align="center"|1 || align="center"| || 2 || 13 || 3 || 1 || 8 || 6.5 || 1.5 || 0.5 || 4.0 || align=center|
|-
|align="left"| || align="center"|G/F || align="left"|Arkansas || align="center"|2 || align="center"|– || 152 || 3,913 || 532 || 219 || 2,027 || 25.7 || 3.5 || 1.4 || 13.3 || align=center|
|-
|align="left"| || align="center"|G/F || align="left"|UCLA || align="center"|2 || align="center"|– || 108 || 1,379 || 200 || 146 || 519 || 12.8 || 1.9 || 1.4 || 4.8 || align=center|
|-
|align="left"| || align="center"|F/C || align="left"|Florida || align="center"|2 || align="center"|– || 95 || 1,781 || 455 || 69 || 514 || 18.7 || 4.8 || 0.7 || 5.4 || align=center|
|-
|align="left"| || align="center"|G || align="left"|Kentucky || align="center"|2 || align="center"|– || 89 || 2,443 || 311 || 197 || 816 || 27.4 || 3.5 || 2.2 || 9.2 || align=center|
|-
|align="left"| || align="center"|G || align="left"|Gonzaga || align="center"|1 || align="center"| || 19 || 234 || 16 || 40 || 62 || 12.3 || 0.8 || 2.1 || 3.3 || align=center|
|-
|align="left"| || align="center"|G || align="left"|NC State || align="center"|1 || align="center"| || 45 || 440 || 81 || 50 || 127 || 9.8 || 1.8 || 1.1 || 2.8 || align=center|
|-
|align="left"| || align="center"|G || align="left"|Providence || align="center"|1 || align="center"| || 27 || 274 || 27 || 66 || 106 || 10.1 || 1.0 || 2.4 || 3.9 || align=center|
|-
|align="left"| || align="center"|F || align="left"|New Mexico Highlands || align="center"|1 || align="center"| || 61 || 717 || 209 || 34 || 300 || 11.8 || 3.4 || 0.6 || 4.9 || align=center|
|-
|align="left"| || align="center"|F/C || align="left"|Colorado || align="center"|2 || align="center"|– || 94 ||  ||  || 225 || 685 ||  ||  || 2.4 || 7.3 || align=center|
|-
|align="left"| || align="center"|G/F || align="left"|Ohio State || align="center"|4 || align="center"|– || 273 || 4,866 || 1,071 || 706 || 1,818 || 23.7 || 3.9 || 2.6 || 6.7 || align=center|
|-
|align="left"| || align="center"|G || align="left"|Missouri || align="center"|1 || align="center"| || 46 || 662 || 39 || 51 || 182 || 14.4 || 0.8 || 1.1 || 4.0 || align=center|
|-
|align="left"| || align="center"|G || align="left"|Syracuse || align="center"|5 || align="center"|– || 269 || 7,657 || 605 || 1,829 || 2,981 || 28.5 || 2.2 || 6.8 || 11.1 || align=center|
|-
|align="left"| || align="center"|C || align="left"|Indiana || align="center"|2 || align="center"|– || 27 || 146 || 41 || 11 || 64 || 5.4 || 1.5 || 0.4 || 2.4 || align=center|
|-
|align="left"| || align="center"|G || align="left"|South Carolina || align="center"|1 || align="center"| || 6 || 51 || 17 || 5 || 19 || 8.5 || 2.8 || 0.8 || 3.2 || align=center|
|-
|align="left"| || align="center"|G || align="left"|Montevallo || align="center"|1 || align="center"| || 15 || 132 || 22 || 6 || 36 || 8.8 || 1.5 || 0.4 || 2.4 || align=center|
|-
|align="left"| || align="center"|G || align="left"|Detroit Mercy || align="center"|2 || align="center"|– || 53 || 260 || 20 || 18 || 151 || 4.9 || 0.4 || 0.3 || 2.8 || align=center|
|-
|align="left"| || align="center"|F || align="left"|Tulane || align="center"|1 || align="center"| || 6 ||  ||  || 0 || 8 ||  ||  || 0.0 || 1.3 || align=center|
|-
|align="left"| || align="center"|F/C || align="left"|William & Mary || align="center"|1 || align="center"| || 14 ||  || 30 || 8 || 29 ||  || 2.1 || 0.6 || 2.1 || align=center|
|}

E to F

|-
|align="left"| || align="center"|F/C || align="left"|Iowa || align="center"|2 || align="center"|– || 104 || 1,357 || 292 || 14 || 476 || 13.0 || 2.8 || 0.1 || 4.6 || align=center|
|-
|align="left"| || align="center"|G/F || align="left"|Virginia Tech || align="center"|1 || align="center"| || 2 || 6 || 1 || 0 || 0 || 3.0 || 0.5 || 0.0 || 0.0 || align=center|
|-
|align="left"| || align="center"|G || align="left"|UCLA || align="center"|1 || align="center"| || 52 || 623 || 55 || 139 || 277 || 12.0 || 1.1 || 2.7 || 5.3 || align=center|
|-
|align="left"| || align="center"|G/F || align="left"|East Carolina || align="center"|1 || align="center"| || 31 || 507 || 65 || 47 || 220 || 16.4 || 2.1 || 1.5 || 7.1 || align=center|
|-
|align="left"| || align="center"|G/F || align="left"|Purdue || align="center"|2 || align="center"|– || 99 ||  ||  || 177 || 800 ||  ||  || 1.8 || 8.1 || align=center|
|-
|align="left"| || align="center"|F || align="left"|Hamline || align="center"|1 || align="center"| || 1 ||  ||  || 0 || 0 ||  ||  || 0.0 || 0.0 || align=center|
|-
|align="left"| || align="center"|F/C || align="left"|Louisville || align="center"|5 || align="center"|– || 193 || 3,355 || 962 || 144 || 908 || 17.4 || 5.0 || 0.7 || 4.7 || align=center|
|-
|align="left" bgcolor="#FFFF99"|^ || align="center"|F/C || align="left"|Miami (OH) || align="center"|2 || align="center"|– || 150 || 1,817 || 615 || 94 || 871 || 12.1 || 4.1 || 0.6 || 5.8 || align=center|
|-
|align="left"| || align="center"|F/C || align="left"|Wisconsin || align="center"|1 || align="center"| || 24 ||  ||  || 17 || 196 ||  ||  || 0.7 || 8.2 || align=center|
|-
|align="left"| || align="center"|C || align="left"| Fenerbahçe || align="center"|1 || align="center"| || 37 || 531 || 107 || 19 || 150 || 14.4 || 2.9 || 0.5 || 4.1 || align=center|
|-
|align="left"| || align="center"|G/F || align="left"|Rhode Island || align="center"|2 || align="center"|– || 34 ||  ||  || 51 || 292 ||  ||  || 1.5 || 8.6 || align=center|
|-
|align="left"| || align="center"|F || align="left"|CCNY || align="center"|1 || align="center"| || 21 ||  ||  || 18 || 72 ||  ||  || 0.9 || 3.4 || align=center|
|-
|align="left"| || align="center"|C || align="left"| Baloncesto Málaga || align="center"|1 || align="center"| || 37 || 488 || 128 || 16 || 164 || 13.2 || 3.5 || 0.4 || 4.4 || align=center|
|-
|align="left"| || align="center"|F || align="left"|Manhattan || align="center"|1 || align="center"| || 33 ||  ||  || 16 || 85 ||  ||  || 0.5 || 2.6 || align=center|
|-
|align="left"| || align="center"|F/C || align="left"|San Francisco || align="center"|3 || align="center"|– || 144 || 912 || 200 || 46 || 328 || 6.3 || 1.4 || 0.3 || 2.3 || align=center|
|-
|align="left"| || align="center"|C || align="left"|Dayton || align="center"|6 || align="center"|– || 436 || 5,277 || 1,605 || 328 || 2,005 || 12.1 || 3.7 || 0.8 || 4.6 || align=center|
|-
|align="left"| || align="center"|G/F || align="left"|Wisconsin || align="center"|1 || align="center"| || 21 || 314 || 33 || 24 || 109 || 15.0 || 1.6 || 1.1 || 5.2 || align=center|
|-
|align="left"| || align="center"|F || align="left"|Holy Cross || align="center"|1 || align="center"| || 5 || 46 || 7 || 0 || 32 || 9.2 || 1.4 || 0.0 || 6.4 || align=center|
|-
|align="left"| || align="center"|G/F || align="left"|Villanova || align="center"|4 || align="center"|– || 309 || 9,058 || 708 || 1,021 || 3,194 || 29.3 || 2.3 || 3.3 || 10.3 || align=center|
|-
|align="left"| || align="center"|G || align="left"|North Carolina || align="center"|1 || align="center"| || 8 || 39 || 6 || 6 || 6 || 4.9 || 0.8 || 0.8 || 0.8 || align=center|
|-
|align="left"| || align="center"|F || align="left"|Cincinnati || align="center"|1 || align="center"| || 55 || 856 || 366 || 29 || 419 || 15.6 || 6.7 || 0.5 || 7.6 || align=center|
|-
|align="left"| || align="center"|G/F || align="left"|North Carolina || align="center"|6 || align="center"|– || 444 || 10,990 || 1,733 || 1,250 || 4,759 || 24.8 || 3.9 || 2.8 || 10.7 || align=center|
|}

G

|-
|align="left"| || align="center"|G/F || align="left"|Iowa || align="center"|6 || align="center"|– || 436 || 10,988 || 1,112 || 1,003 || 4,895 || 25.2 || 2.6 || 2.3 || 11.2 || align=center|
|-
|align="left"| || align="center"|G || align="left"|St. John's || align="center"|3 || align="center"|– || 92 ||  ||  || 134 || 476 ||  ||  || 1.5 || 5.2 || align=center|
|-
|align="left" bgcolor="#FFCC00"|+ || align="center"|F/C || align="left"|Farragut Academy (IL) || align="center"|6 || align="center"|– || 396 || 12,266 || 3,301 || 1,078 || 6,233 || 31.0 || 8.3 || 2.7 || 15.7 || align=center|
|-
|align="left"| || align="center"|G || align="left"|Santa Clara || align="center"|1 || align="center"| || 24 || 205 || 21 || 18 || 51 || 8.5 || 0.9 || 0.8 || 2.1 || align=center|
|-
|align="left"| || align="center"|F/C || align="left"|Creighton || align="center"|1 || align="center"| || 2 ||  ||  || 1 || 7 ||  ||  || 0.5 || 3.5 || align=center|
|-
|align="left"| || align="center"|G || align="left"|New Mexico State || align="center"|1 || align="center"| || 4 || 40 || 3 || 4 || 34 || 10.0 || 0.8 || 1.0 || 8.5 || align=center|
|-
|align="left"| || align="center"|G || align="left"|New Mexico || align="center"|2 || align="center"|– || 27 || 107 || 23 || 6 || 28 || 4.0 || 0.9 || 0.2 || 1.0 || align=center|
|-
|align="left" bgcolor="#FFFF99"|^ || align="center"|C || align="left"|Jacksonville || align="center"|1 || align="center"| || 47 || 521 || 148 || 12 || 164 || 11.1 || 3.1 || 0.3 || 3.5 || align=center|
|-
|align="left"| || align="center"|F || align="left"|Western Kentucky || align="center"|1 || align="center"| || 25 || 119 || 46 || 4 || 65 || 4.8 || 1.8 || 0.2 || 2.6 || align=center|
|-
|align="left"| || align="center"|F || align="left"|Providence || align="center"|2 || align="center"|– || 134 || 3,651 || 705 || 177 || 1,342 || 27.2 || 5.3 || 1.3 || 10.0 || align=center|
|-
|align="left"| || align="center"|G || align="left"|NYU || align="center"|2 || align="center"|– || 70 || 889 || 118 || 75 || 327 || 12.7 || 1.7 || 1.1 || 4.7 || align=center|
|-
|align="left"| || align="center"|F || align="left"|New Orleans || align="center"|1 || align="center"| || 72 || 528 || 92 || 42 || 177 || 7.3 || 1.3 || 0.6 || 2.5 || align=center|
|-
|align="left"| || align="center"|G/F || align="left"|Harvard || align="center"|1 || align="center"| || 55 ||  ||  || 47 || 350 ||  ||  || 0.9 || 6.4 || align=center|
|-
|align="left"| || align="center"|G/F || align="left"|Gulf Shores Academy (TX) || align="center"|3 || align="center"|– || 160 || 2,692 || 333 || 134 || 1,272 || 16.8 || 2.1 || 0.8 || 8.0 || align=center|
|-
|align="left"| || align="center"|F || align="left"|Georgetown || align="center"|4 || align="center"|– || 222 || 6,762 || 925 || 338 || 3,252 || 30.5 || 4.2 || 1.5 || 14.6 || align=center|
|-
|align="left"| || align="center"|G || align="left"|Michigan || align="center"|1 || align="center"| || 26 || 367 || 24 || 68 || 106 || 14.1 || 0.9 || 2.6 || 4.1 || align=center|
|-
|align="left"| || align="center"|G/F || align="left"|Duquesne || align="center"|1 || align="center"| || 10 || 92 || 11 || 9 || 32 || 9.2 || 1.1 || 0.9 || 3.2 || align=center|
|-
|align="left"| || align="center"|G || align="left"|Louisiana || align="center"|1 || align="center"| || 80 || 1,235 || 145 || 129 || 254 || 15.4 || 1.8 || 1.6 || 3.2 || align=center|
|-
|align="left"| || align="center"|G/F || align="left"|Seton Hall || align="center"|2 || align="center"|– || 116 || 2,304 || 459 || 204 || 578 || 19.9 || 4.0 || 1.8 || 5.0 || align=center|
|-
|align="left"| || align="center"|F || align="left"|George Washington || align="center"|4 || align="center"|– || 129 || 1,082 || 294 || 36 || 413 || 8.4 || 2.3 || 0.3 || 3.2 || align=center|
|-
|align="left"| || align="center"|F || align="left"|NC State || align="center"|1 || align="center"| || 20 || 218 || 43 || 12 || 26 || 10.9 || 2.2 || 0.6 || 1.3 || align=center|
|}

H

|-
|align="left"| || align="center"|C || align="left"|West Texas A&M || align="center"|1 || align="center"| || 33 ||  ||  || 61 || 310 ||  ||  || 1.8 || 9.4 || align=center|
|-
|align="left"| || align="center"|C || align="left"|Tennessee || align="center"|1 || align="center"| || 35 || 268 || 60 || 7 || 76 || 7.7 || 1.7 || 0.2 || 2.2 || align=center|
|-
|align="left"| || align="center"|C || align="left"|Pittsburgh || align="center"|1 || align="center"| || 11 || 70 || 22 || 1 || 25 || 6.4 || 2.0 || 0.1 || 2.3 || align=center|
|-
|align="left"| || align="center"|G || align="left"|Oklahoma State || align="center"|1 || align="center"| || 25 ||  ||  || 8 || 70 ||  ||  || 0.3 || 2.8 || align=center|
|-
|align="left"| || align="center"|F || align="left"|Penn || align="center"|2 || align="center"|– || 31 || 187 || 57 || 6 || 122 || 6.0 || 1.8 || 0.2 || 3.9 || align=center|
|-
|align="left"| || align="center"|F || align="left"|Kentucky || align="center"|1 || align="center"| || 8 || 26 || 6 || 1 || 6 || 3.3 || 0.8 || 0.1 || 0.8 || align=center|
|-
|align="left"| || align="center"|F || align="left"|Notre Dame || align="center"|1 || align="center"| || 28 || 241 || 55 || 10 || 63 || 8.6 || 2.0 || 0.4 || 2.3 || align=center|
|-
|align="left"| || align="center"|F/C || align="left"|Oklahoma State || align="center"|4 || align="center"|– || 251 || 5,768 || 1,780 || 365 || 1,692 || 27.9 || 7.1 || 1.5 || 6.7 || align=center|
|-
|align="left"| || align="center"|G || align="left"|New Orleans || align="center"|2 || align="center"|– || 8 || 106 || 10 || 8 || 58 || 13.3 || 1.3 || 1.0 || 7.3 || align=center|
|-
|align="left" bgcolor="#FFFF99"|^ (#17) || align="center"|G/F || align="left"|Ohio State || align="center" bgcolor="#CFECEC"|16 || align="center"|– || bgcolor="#CFECEC"|1,270 || bgcolor="#CFECEC"|46,471 || 8,007 || 6,114 || bgcolor="#CFECEC"|26,395 || 36.6 || 6.3 || 4.8 || 20.8 || align=center|
|-
|align="left"| || align="center"|G || align="left"|Xavier || align="center"|1 || align="center"| || 29 || 326 || 31 || 64 || 80 || 11.2 || 1.1 || 2.2 || 2.8 || align=center|
|-
|align="left"| || align="center"|G/F || align="left"|Butler || align="center"|2 || align="center"|– || 73 || 1,868 || 323 || 244 || 827 || 25.6 || 4.4 || 3.3 || 11.3 || align=center|
|-
|align="left"| || align="center"|G || align="left"|Indiana State || align="center"|1 || align="center"| || 6 ||  ||  || 3 || 18 ||  ||  || 0.5 || 3.0 || align=center|
|-
|align="left" bgcolor="#FFFF99"|^ (#15) || align="center"|F/C || align="left"|Holy Cross || align="center"|9 || align="center"|– || 654 || 19,254 || 5,749 || 1,318 || 12,194 || 29.4 || 8.8 || 2.0 || 18.6 || align=center|
|-
|align="left"| || align="center"|F || align="left"|Wake Forest || align="center"|2 || align="center"|– || 138 || 2,384 || 703 || 102 || 863 || 17.3 || 5.1 || 0.7 || 6.3 || align=center|
|-
|align="left"| || align="center"|G || align="left"|VCU || align="center"|5 || align="center"|– || 400 || 8,152 || 638 || 1,107 || 3,521 || 20.4 || 1.6 || 2.8 || 8.8 || align=center|
|-
|align="left"| || align="center"|G || align="left"|UC Santa Barbara || align="center"|2 || align="center"|– || 46 || 312 || 37 || 39 || 132 || 6.8 || 0.8 || 0.8 || 2.9 || align=center|
|-
|align="left"| || align="center"|F/C || align="left"|Minnesota || align="center"|2 || align="center"| || 27 || 22 || 7 || 20 || 150 || 5.5 || 1.8 || 0.7 || 5.6 || align=center|
|-
|align="left"| || align="center"|G || align="left"|Fresno State || align="center"|1 || align="center"| || 25 || 408 || 21 || 56 || 83 || 16.3 || 0.8 || 2.2 || 3.3 || align=center|
|-
|align="left"| || align="center"|G || align="left"|CCNY || align="center"|2 || align="center"|– || 133 ||  || 260 || 444 || 1,328 ||  || 4.0 || 3.3 || 10.0 || align=center|
|-
|align="left"| || align="center"|F/C || align="left"|Temple || align="center"|1 || align="center"| || 24 ||  ||  || 1 || 65 ||  ||  || 0.0 || 2.7 || align=center|
|-
|align="left"| || align="center"|G || align="left"|Brooklyn || align="center"|1 || align="center"| || 13 ||  ||  || 10 || 19 ||  ||  || 0.8 || 1.5 || align=center|
|-
|align="left"| || align="center"|G || align="left"|Queens || align="center"|2 || align="center"|– || 42 ||  ||  || 27 || 221 ||  ||  || 0.6 || 5.3 || align=center|
|-
|align="left"| || align="center"|SF || align="left"|BU || align="center"|1 || align="center"| || 1 || 1 || 0 || 0 || 0 || 1.0 || 0.0 || 0.0 || 0.0 || align=center|
|-
|align="left"| || align="center"|C || align="left"|UCLA || align="center"|1 || align="center"| || 15 || 160 || 26 || 3 || 42 || 10.7 || 1.7 || 0.2 || 2.8 || align=center|
|-
|align="left" bgcolor="#FFCC00"|+ || align="center"|F/C || align="left"|Florida || align="center"|3 || align="center"|– || 208 || 6,443 || 1,453 || 959 || 2,804 || 31.0 || 7.0 || 4.6 || 13.5 || align=center|
|-
|align="left" bgcolor="#FFFF99"|^ || align="center"|F/C || align="left"|Washington || align="center"|1 || align="center"| ||  ||  ||  ||  ||  ||  ||  ||  ||  || align=center|
|-
|align="left"| || align="center"|G || align="left"|Arizona State || align="center"|3 || align="center"|– || 209 || 3,805 || 393 || 292 || 1,633 || 18.2 || 1.9 || 1.4 || 7.8 || align=center|
|-
|align="left" bgcolor="#FFFF99"|^ || align="center"|F || align="left"|Mississippi State || align="center"|4 || align="center"|– || 323 || 9,909 || 2,717 || 493 || 5,812 || 30.7 || 8.4 || 1.5 || 18.0 || align=center|
|-
|align="left"| || align="center"|G || align="left"|UT Martin || align="center"|1 || align="center"| || 16 || 70 || 8 || 8 || 22 || 4.4 || 0.5 || 0.5 || 1.4 || align=center|
|-
|align="left"| || align="center"|G || align="left"|Colorado || align="center"|1 || align="center"| || 6 || 52 || 3 || 10 || 10 || 8.7 || 0.5 || 1.7 || 1.7 || align=center|
|-
|align="left"| || align="center"|F/C || align="left"|Minnesota || align="center"|1 || align="center"| || 69 || 1,376 || 409 || 67 || 579 || 19.9 || 5.9 || 1.0 || 8.4 || align=center|
|-
|align="left"| || align="center"|F || align="left"|Ohio || align="center"|1 || align="center"| || 36 || 406 || 118 || 19 || 125 || 11.3 || 3.3 || 0.5 || 3.5 || align=center|
|-
|align="left"| || align="center"|G || align="left"|Georgia State || align="center"|2 || align="center"| || 37 || 341 || 40 || 16 || 114 || 9.2 || 1.1 || 0.4 || 3.1 || align=center|
|}

I to J

|-
|align="left" bgcolor="#FFCC00"|+ || align="center"|G || align="left"|Duke || align="center"|2 || align="center"|– || 127 || 4,145 || 562 || 770 || 3,062 || 32.6 || 4.4 || 6.1 || 24.1 || align=center|
|-
|align="left"| || align="center"|G || align="left"|Notre Dame || align="center"|1 || align="center"| || 5 || 17 || 4 || 3 || 10 || 3.4 || 0.8 || 0.6 || 2.0 || align=center|
|-
|align="left"| || align="center"|G/F || align="left"|Notre Dame || align="center"|1 || align="center"| || 11 || 66 || 12 || 5 || 26 || 6.0 || 1.1 || 0.5 || 2.4 || align=center|
|-
|align="left"| || align="center"|G || align="left"|Duquesne || align="center"|1 || align="center"| || 55 || 1,684 || 176 || 244 || 588 || 30.6 || 3.2 || 4.4 || 10.7 || align=center|
|-
|align="left"| || align="center"|G/F || align="left"|Valparaiso || align="center"|1 || align="center"| || 3 ||  ||  || 0 || 3 ||  ||  || 0.0 || 1.0 || align=center|
|-
|align="left"| || align="center"|F/C || align="left"|Prentiss HS (MS) || align="center"|3 || align="center"|– || 199 || 4,432 || 1,367 || 142 || 2,046 || 22.3 || 6.9 || 0.7 || 10.3 || align=center|
|-
|align="left"| || align="center"|F || align="left"| Pallacanestro Biella || align="center"|3 || align="center"|– || 185 || 2,935 || 700 || 163 || 846 || 15.9 || 3.8 || 0.9 || 4.6 || align=center|
|-
|align="left"| || align="center"|F/C || align="left"|Westchester HS (CA) || align="center"|2 || align="center"|– || 159 || 3,408 || 871 || 278 || 1,097 || 21.4 || 5.5 || 1.7 || 6.9 || align=center|
|-
|align="left"| || align="center"|C || align="left"|LSU || align="center"|1 || align="center"| || 4 || 32 || 5 || 1 || 6 || 8.0 || 1.3 || 0.3 || 1.5 || align=center|
|-
|align="left"| || align="center"|G/F || align="left"|Dayton || align="center"|1 || align="center"| || 40 || 789 || 97 || 31 || 250 || 19.7 || 2.4 || 0.8 || 6.3 || align=center|
|-
|align="left" bgcolor="#FFFF99"|^ (#3) || align="center"|G || align="left"|Pepperdine || align="center"|7 || align="center"|– || 541 || 18,321 || 1,757 || 3,486 || 6,805 || 33.9 || 3.2 || 6.4 || 12.6 || align=center|
|-
|align="left"| || align="center"|F || align="left"|Purdue || align="center"|1 || align="center"| || 36 || 298 || 58 || 6 || 114 || 8.3 || 1.6 || 0.2 || 3.2 || align=center|
|-
|align="left"| || align="center"|G/F || align="left"|Arkansas || align="center"|1 || align="center"| || 48 || 1,003 || 139 || 74 || 304 || 20.9 || 2.9 || 1.5 || 6.3 || align=center|
|-
|align="left"| || align="center"|C || align="left"|Grambling State || align="center"|3 || align="center"|– || 97 || 1,074 || 265 || 39 || 457 || 11.1 || 2.7 || 0.4 || 4.7 || align=center|
|-
|align="left"| || align="center"|G || align="left"|Houston || align="center"|1 || align="center"| || 13 || 213 || 31 || 29 || 76 || 16.4 || 2.4 || 2.2 || 5.8 || align=center|
|-
|align="left"| || align="center"|F || align="left"|Mississippi State || align="center"|1 || align="center"| || 15 || 91 || 9 || 5 || 44 || 6.1 || 0.6 || 0.3 || 2.9 || align=center|
|-
|align="left"| || align="center"|F/C || align="left"|Saint Joseph's || align="center"|1 || align="center"| || 14 || 87 || 31 || 2 || 14 || 6.2 || 2.2 || 0.1 || 1.0 || align=center|
|-
|align="left"| || align="center"|F || align="left"|Cal State Los Angeles || align="center"|1 || align="center"| || 51 || 475 || 114 || 26 || 214 || 9.3 || 2.2 || 0.5 || 4.2 || align=center|
|-
|align="left"| || align="center"|F || align="left"|Georgia || align="center"|1 || align="center"| || 42 || 373 || 68 || 14 || 93 || 8.9 || 1.6 || 0.3 || 2.2 || align=center|
|-
|align="left" bgcolor="#FFFF99"|^ (#25) || align="center"|G || align="left"|San Francisco || align="center"|9 || align="center"|– || 676 || 17,501 || 2,399 || 2,908 || 5,011 || 25.9 || 3.5 || 4.3 || 7.4 || align=center|
|-
|align="left"| || align="center"|F || align="left"|Murray State || align="center"|1 || align="center"| || 18 || 206 || 52 || 15 || 54 || 11.4 || 2.9 || 0.8 || 3.0 || align=center|
|-
|align="left" bgcolor="#FFFF99"|^ (#24) || align="center"|G/F || align="left"|North Carolina Central || align="center"|12 || align="center"|– || 871 || 24,285 || 4,305 || 2,209 || 15,411 || 27.9 || 4.9 || 2.5 || 17.7 || align=center|
|-
|align="left"| || align="center"|F || align="left"|Syracuse || align="center"|1 || align="center"| || 6 || 24 || 5 || 1 || 7 || 4.0 || 0.8 || 0.2 || 1.2 || align=center|
|-
|align="left"| || align="center"|G/F || align="left"|Utah || align="center"|2 || align="center"|– || 146 || 2,195 || 257 || 192 || 1,060 || 15.0 || 1.8 || 1.3 || 7.3 || align=center|
|}

K to L

|-
|align="left"| || align="center"|F || align="left"|Holy Cross || align="center"|2 || align="center"|– || 76 ||  ||  || 206 || 838 ||  ||  || 2.7 || 11.0 || align=center|
|-
|align="left"| || align="center"|G || align="left"|Forest Hills HS (NY) || align="center"|1 || align="center"| || 18 ||  ||  || 6 || 74 ||  ||  || 0.3 || 4.1 || align=center|
|-
|align="left"| || align="center"|F || align="left"|Marshall || align="center"|1 || align="center"| || 43 ||  ||  || 21 || 256 ||  ||  || 0.5 || 6.0 || align=center|
|-
|align="left"| || align="center"|G || align="left"|NYU || align="center"|1 || align="center"| || 27 ||  ||  || 38 || 191 ||  ||  || 1.4 || 7.1 || align=center|
|-
|align="left"| || align="center"|F/C || align="left"|UConn || align="center"|1 || align="center"| || 38 || 222 || 146 || 13 || 97 || 5.8 || 3.8 || 0.3 || 2.6 || align=center|
|-
|align="left"| || align="center"|G || align="left"|Kansas || align="center"|1 || align="center"| || 1 || 19 || 4 || 2 || 10 || 19.0 || 4.0 || 2.0 || 10.0 || align=center|
|-
|align="left"| || align="center"|F/C || align="left"|Oklahoma || align="center"|1 || align="center"| || 5 || 33 || 9 || 1 || 12 || 6.6 || 1.8 || 0.2 || 2.4 || align=center|
|-
|align="left"| || align="center"|F/C || align="left"|Rice || align="center"|2 || align="center"|– || 81 ||  ||  || 126 || 871 ||  ||  || 1.6 || 10.8 || align=center|
|-
|align="left"| || align="center"|C || align="left"|BYU || align="center"|5 || align="center"|– || 241 || 1,916 || 472 || 70 || 378 || 8.0 || 2.0 || 0.3 || 1.6 || align=center|
|-
|align="left"| || align="center"|C || align="left"|Arkansas || align="center"|5 || align="center"|– || 329 || 4,833 || 1,378 || 170 || 1,447 || 14.7 || 4.2 || 0.5 || 4.4 || align=center|
|-
|align="left"| || align="center"|G/F || align="left"|Pittsburgh || align="center"|1 || align="center"| || 40 || 1,119 || 173 || 66 || 556 || 28.0 || 4.3 || 1.7 || 13.9 || align=center|
|-
|align="left"| || align="center"|C || align="left"|UConn || align="center"|1 || align="center"| || 74 || 1,503 || 365 || 104 || 482 || 20.3 || 4.9 || 1.4 || 6.5 || align=center|
|-
|align="left"| || align="center"|G || align="left"|Nebraska–Kearney || align="center"|1 || align="center"| || 7 || 41 || 1 || 10 || 17 || 5.9 || 0.1 || 1.4 || 2.4 || align=center|
|-
|align="left"| || align="center"|C || align="left"|Culver-Stockton || align="center"|1 || align="center"| || 53 ||  ||  || 17 || 165 ||  ||  || 0.3 || 3.1 || align=center|
|-
|align="left"| || align="center"|G || align="left"|Drake || align="center"|1 || align="center"| || 25 || 100 || 12 || 9 || 30 || 4.0 || 0.5 || 0.4 || 1.2 || align=center|
|-
|align="left"| || align="center"|C || align="left"| Partizan || align="center"|1 || align="center"| || 24 || 553 || 128 || 8 || 218 || 23.0 || 5.3 || 0.3 || 9.1 || align=center|
|-
|align="left"| || align="center"|F/C || align="left"|Bradley || align="center"|8 || align="center"|–– || 499 || 7,295 || 1,998 || 300 || 2,929 || 14.6 || 4.0 || 0.6 || 5.9 || align=center|
|-
|align="left"| || align="center"|G/F || align="left"|Saint Mary's || align="center"|1 || align="center"| || 27 ||  ||  || 30 || 128 ||  ||  || 1.1 || 4.7 || align=center|
|-
|align="left"| || align="center"|G || align="left"|Houston || align="center"|1 || align="center"| || 1 || 22 || 4 || 2 || 7 || 22.0 || 4.0 || 2.0 || 7.0 || align=center|
|-
|align="left"| || align="center"|F/C || align="left"|Kansas || align="center"|3 || align="center"|– || 179 || 4,557 || 1,038 || 237 || 1,655 || 25.5 || 5.8 || 1.3 || 9.2 || align=center|
|-
|align="left"| || align="center"|F || align="left"|Wisconsin || align="center"|1 || align="center"| || 1 || 3 || 0 || 0 || 0 || 3.0 || 0.0 || 0.0 || 0.0 || align=center|
|-
|align="left"| || align="center"|G || align="left"|Miami (FL) || align="center"|1 || align="center"| || 54 || 775 || 92 || 98 || 231 || 14.4 || 1.7 || 1.8 || 4.3 || align=center|
|-
|align="left"| || align="center"|F || align="left"|Yale || align="center"|1 || align="center"| || 56 ||  ||  || 40 || 492 ||  ||  || 0.7 || 8.8 || align=center|
|-
|align="left"| || align="center"|G || align="left"|Western Kentucky || align="center"|2 || align="center"|– || 108 || 2,445 || 239 || 175 || 833 || 22.6 || 2.2 || 1.6 || 7.7 || align=center|
|-
|align="left"| || align="center"|F || align="left"|Florida || align="center"|1 || align="center"| || 30 || 470 || 130 || 54 || 214 || 15.7 || 4.3 || 1.8 || 7.1 || align=center|
|-
|align="left"| || align="center"|G/F || align="left"|Dartmouth || align="center"|2 || align="center"|– || 121 ||  || 118 || 225 || 949 ||  || 2.1 || 1.9 || 7.8 || align=center|
|-
|align="left" bgcolor="#FFCC00"|+ (#35) || align="center"|G/F || align="left"|Northeastern || align="center"|6 || align="center"|– || 450 || 14,676 || 1,938 || 1,153 || 7,902 || 32.6 || 4.3 || 2.6 || 17.6 || align=center|
|-
|align="left"| || align="center"|G/F || align="left"|Stanford || align="center"|1 || align="center"| || 4 || 48 || 8 || 6 || 19 || 12.0 || 2.0 || 1.5 || 4.8 || align=center|
|-
|align="left"| || align="center"|F/C || align="left"|Arizona State || align="center"|2 || align="center"|– || 110 || 1,163 || 419 || 28 || 220 || 10.6 || 3.8 || 0.3 || 2.0 || align=center|
|-
|align="left"| || align="center"|F/C || align="left"|Iowa || align="center"|2 || align="center"|– || 118 || 1,456 || 280 || 98 || 566 || 12.3 || 2.4 || 0.8 || 4.8 || align=center|
|-
|align="left"| || align="center"|F || align="left"|Eastern Michigan || align="center"|1 || align="center"| || 41 || 488 || 83 || 25 || 72 || 11.9 || 2.0 || 0.6 || 1.8 || align=center|
|-
|align="left"| || align="center"|F || align="left"|Oregon || align="center"|9 || align="center"|– || 511 || 9,431 || 2,848 || 353 || 3,156 || 18.5 || 5.6 || 0.7 || 6.2 || align=center|
|-
|align="left" bgcolor="#FFFF99"|^ || align="center"|F/C || align="left"|Kansas || align="center"|2 || align="center"|– || 106 || 1,005 || 303 || 51 || 696 || 9.5 || 2.9 || 0.5 || 6.6 || align=center|
|-
|align="left"| || align="center"|G/F || align="left"|Fordham || align="center"|1 || align="center"| || 2 ||  ||  || 2 || 2 ||  ||  || 1.0 || 1.0 || align=center|
|}

M

|-
|align="left" bgcolor="#FFFF99"|^ (#22) || align="center"|F/C || align="left"|Saint Louis || align="center"|6 || align="center"|– || 416 || 13,385 || 3,367 || 1,521 || 7,882 || 38.5 || 8.1 || 3.7 || 18.9 || align=center|
|-
|align="left"| || align="center"|C || align="left"|Georgetown || align="center"|4 || align="center"|– || 199 || 1,352 || 498 || 247 || 723 || 10.5 || 2.8 || 1.2 || 3.6 || align=center|
|-
|align="left"| || align="center"|F || align="left"|Brown || align="center"|1 || align="center"| || 6 || 34 || 7 || 1 || 12 || 5.7 || 1.2 || 0.2 || 2.0 || align=center|
|-
|align="left" bgcolor="#FFFF99"|^ || align="center"|G || align="left"|LSU || align="center"|1 || align="center"| || 26 || 442 || 38 || 29 || 299 || 17.0 || 1.5 || 1.1 || 11.5 || align=center|
|-
|align="left"| || align="center"|G || align="left"|Georgia Tech || align="center"|1 || align="center"| || 23 || 414 || 28 || 75 || 88 || 18.0 || 1.2 || 3.3 || 3.8 || align=center|
|-
|align="left"| || align="center"|G || align="left"|Harvard || align="center"|1 || align="center"| || 43 ||  ||  || 60 || 333 ||  ||  || 1.4 || 7.7 || align=center|
|-
|align="left"| || align="center"|F || align="left"|Maryland || align="center"|1 || align="center"| || 7 || 46 || 9 || 0 || 10 || 6.6 || 1.3 || 0.0 || 1.4 || align=center|
|-
|align="left"| (#31) || align="center"|F || align="left"|Charlotte || align="center"|8 || align="center"|– || 607 || 18,495 || 4,023 || 1,390 || 8,311 || 30.5 || 6.6 || 2.3 || 13.7 || align=center|
|-
|align="left" bgcolor="#FFFF99"|^ || align="center"|F/C || align="left"|North Carolina || align="center"|1 || align="center"| || 20 || 637 || 141 || 40 || 411 || 31.9 || 7.1 || 2.0 || 20.6 || align=center|
|-
|align="left"| || align="center"|G || align="left"|Canisius || align="center"|1 || align="center"| || 28 || 206 || 35 || 24 || 37 || 7.4 || 1.3 || 0.9 || 1.3 || align=center|
|-
|align="left"| || align="center"|F || align="left"|Kentucky || align="center"|8 || align="center"|– || 494 || 9,476 || 1,402 || 623 || 2,806 || 19.2 || 2.8 || 1.3 || 5.7 || align=center|
|-
|align="left"| || align="center"|F || align="left"|Wichita State || align="center"|3 || align="center"|– || 232 || 5,616 || 1,189 || 397 || 2,626 || 24.2 || 5.1 || 1.7 || 11.3 || align=center|
|-
|align="left"| || align="center"|G/F || align="left"|Long Beach State || align="center"|2 || align="center"|– || 137 || 1,414 || 203 || 92 || 590 || 10.3 || 1.5 || 0.7 || 4.3 || align=center|
|-
|align="left" bgcolor="#FFFF99"|^ (#32) || align="center"|F/C || align="left"|Minnesota || align="center"|13 || align="center"|– || 971 || 30,118 || 7,122 || 1,670 || 17,335 || 31.0 || 7.3 || 1.7 || 17.9 || align=center|
|-
|align="left"| || align="center"|F/C || align="left"|North Carolina || align="center"|2 || align="center"|– || 97 || 1,083 || 354 || 190 || 572 || 17.2 || 3.6 || 2.0 || 5.9 || align=center|
|-
|align="left"| || align="center"|F/C || align="left"|Tennessee || align="center"|1 || align="center"| || 7 ||  || 26 || 11 || 44 ||  || 3.7 || 1.6 || 6.3 || align=center|
|-
|align="left"| || align="center"|C || align="left"|Syracuse || align="center"|1 || align="center"| || 6 || 36 || 3 || 0 || 7 || 6.0 || 0.5 || 0.0 || 1.2 || align=center|
|-
|align="left"| || align="center"|G/F || align="left"|Kentucky || align="center"|2 || align="center"|– || 121 || 4,213 || 435 || 280 || 1,919 || 34.8 || 3.6 || 2.3 || 15.9 || align=center|
|-
|align="left"| || align="center"|F || align="left"|LSU || align="center"|2 || align="center"|– || 41 || 198 || 47 || 8 || 59 || 4.8 || 1.1 || 0.2 || 1.4 || align=center|
|-
|align="left"| || align="center"|C || align="left"|Texas || align="center"|1 || align="center"| || 54 || 939 || 273 || 11 || 330 || 17.4 || 5.1 || 0.2 || 6.1 || align=center|
|-
|align="left"| || align="center"|F/C || align="left"|DePaul || align="center"|1 || align="center"| || 9 || 71 || 20 || 3 || 21 || 7.9 || 2.2 || 0.3 || 2.3 || align=center|
|-
|align="left"| || align="center"|F/C || align="left"| Vršac || align="center"|1 || align="center"| || 1 || 5 || 1 || 0 || 0 || 5.0 || 1.0 || 0.0 || 0.0 || align=center|
|-
|align="left"| || align="center"|G || align="left"|Kentucky || align="center"|1 || align="center"| || 61 || 868 || 75 || 190 || 196 || 14.2 || 1.2 || 3.1 || 3.2 || align=center|
|-
|align="left"| || align="center"|G/F || align="left"|Louisville || align="center"|5 || align="center"|– || 277 || 5,144 || 741 || 384 || 1,902 || 18.6 || 2.7 || 1.4 || 6.9 || align=center|
|-
|align="left"| || align="center"|F || align="left"|Ohio State || align="center"|1 || align="center"| || 4 || 20 || 4 || 2 || 5 || 5.0 || 1.0 || 0.5 || 1.3 || align=center|
|-
|align="left"| || align="center"|F/C || align="left"|UCLA || align="center"|1 || align="center"| || 24 || 135 || 42 || 3 || 35 || 5.6 || 1.8 || 0.1 || 1.5 || align=center|
|-
|align="left"| || align="center"|F/C || align="left"|Georgetown || align="center"|2 || align="center"|– || 28 || 501 || 168 || 60 || 271 || 17.9 || 6.0 || 2.1 || 9.7 || align=center|
|-
|align="left"| || align="center"|C || align="left"|North Carolina || align="center"|2 || align="center"|– || 139 || 3,747 || 918 || 79 || 1,223 || 27.0 || 6.6 || 0.6 || 8.8 || align=center|
|-
|align="left"| || align="center"|G/F || align="left"|Purdue || align="center"|1 || align="center"| || 38 || 331 || 33 || 34 || 110 || 8.7 || 0.9 || 0.9 || 2.9 || align=center|
|-
|align="left"| || align="center"|F/C || align="left"|Nebraska || align="center"|2 || align="center"| || 27 || 468 || 107 || 25 || 116 || 17.3 || 4.0 || 0.9 || 4.3 || align=center|
|-
|align="left"| || align="center"|G || align="left"|Jacksonville || align="center"|2 || align="center"|– || 62 || 416 || 91 || 39 || 172 || 6.7 || 1.5 || 0.6 || 2.8 || align=center|
|-
|align="left"| || align="center"|F || align="left"|Kansas || align="center"|2 || align="center"|– || 129 || 3,538 || 747 || 181 || 1,780 || 27.4 || 5.8 || 1.4 || 13.8 || align=center|
|-
|align="left"| || align="center"|F/C || align="left"|Idaho || align="center"|2 || align="center"|– || 142 || 2,137 || 796 || 135 || 534 || 15.0 || 5.6 || 1.0 || 3.8 || align=center|
|-
|align="left"| || align="center"|G || align="left"|Holy Cross || align="center"|1 || align="center"| || 37 ||  ||  || 52 || 30 ||  ||  || 1.4 || 0.8 || align=center|
|-
|align="left"| || align="center"|C || align="left"|Delta State || align="center"|1 || align="center"| || 9 || 33 || 3 || 1 || 6 || 3.7 || 0.3 || 0.1 || 0.7 || align=center|
|-
|align="left"| || align="center"|G || align="left"|Dartmouth || align="center"|1 || align="center"| || 21 ||  ||  || 3 || 71 ||  ||  || 0.1 || 3.4 || align=center|
|-
|align="left"| || align="center"|G || align="left"|Manhattan || align="center"|1 || align="center"| || 7 ||  ||  || 3 || 2 ||  ||  || 0.4 || 0.3 || align=center|
|-
|align="left"| || align="center"|F/C || align="left"|Notre Dame || align="center"|1 || align="center"| || 17 || 178 || 38 || 6 || 44 || 10.5 || 2.2 || 0.4 || 2.6 || align=center|
|}

N to P

|-
|align="left"| || align="center"|F || align="left"|Iowa State || align="center"|1 || align="center"| || 48 || 522 || 71 || 26 || 146 || 10.9 || 1.5 || 0.5 || 3.0 || align=center|
|-
|align="left"| || align="center"|F/C || align="left"|UCLA || align="center"|3 || align="center"|– || 220 || 4,307 || 1,011 || 208 || 2,274 || 19.6 || 4.6 || 0.9 || 10.3 || align=center|
|-
|align="left" bgcolor="#FFFF99"|^ (#19) || align="center"|F || align="left"|Iowa || align="center"|11 || align="center"|– || 872 || 18,970 || 4,517 || 1,354 || 9,968 || 21.8 || 5.2 || 1.6 || 11.4 || align=center|
|-
|align="left"| || align="center"|G || align="left"|Saint Joseph's || align="center"|1 || align="center"| || 6 || 121 || 17 || 33 || 29 || 20.2 || 2.8 || 5.5 || 4.8 || align=center|
|-
|align="left"| || align="center"|F/C || align="left"|Washington || align="center"|5 || align="center"|– || 314 || 7,721 || 1,834 || 533 || 2,747 || 24.6 || 7.2 || 1.7 || 8.7 || align=center|
|-
|align="left"| || align="center"|C || align="left"|Saint Louis || align="center"|1 || align="center"| || 6 || 18 || 6 || 2 || 6 || 3.0 || 1.0 || 0.3 || 1.0 || align=center|
|-
|align="left"| || align="center"|C || align="left"|Saint Louis || align="center"|1 || align="center"| || 3 || 25 || 8 || 3 || 6 || 8.3 || 2.7 || 1.0 || 2.0 || align=center|
|-
|align="left"| || align="center"|F/C || align="left"|Wyoming || align="center"|2 || align="center"|– || 45 ||  ||  || 55 || 373 ||  ||  || 1.2 || 8.3 || align=center|
|-
|align="left"| || align="center"|G || align="left"|Duquesne || align="center"|2 || align="center"|– || 52 ||  ||  || 29 || 153 ||  ||  || 0.6 || 2.9 || align=center|
|-
|align="left"| || align="center"|C || align="left"|Bradley || align="center"|1 || align="center"| || 26 || 108 || 34 || 8 || 40 || 4.2 || 1.3 || 0.3 || 1.5 || align=center|
|-
|align="left"| || align="center"|G || align="left"|Holy Cross || align="center"|2 || align="center"|– || 58 ||  ||  || 129 || 381 ||  ||  || 2.2 || 6.6 || align=center|
|-
|align="left" bgcolor="#CCFFCC"|x || align="center"|F || align="left"|SMU || align="center"|2 || align="center"|– || 129 || 1,744 || 247 || 43 || 381 || 13.5 || 1.9 || 0.3 || 3.0 || align=center|
|-
|align="left"| || align="center"|G/F || align="left"|Purdue || align="center"|1 || align="center"| || 44 || 540 || 46 || 33 || 216 || 12.3 || 1.0 || 0.8 || 4.9 || align=center|
|-
|align="left"| || align="center"|C || align="left"|Pacific || align="center"|2 || align="center"|– || 40 || 401 || 89 || 11 || 85 || 10.0 || 2.2 || 0.3 || 2.1 || align=center|
|-
|align="left"| || align="center"|F/C || align="left"|Louisville || align="center"|1 || align="center"| || 7 || 43 || 14 || 4 || 14 || 6.1 || 2.0 || 0.6 || 2.0 || align=center|
|-
|align="left"| || align="center"|F/C || align="left"|Gonzaga || align="center"|4 || align="center"|– || 278 || 5,756 || 1,310 || 471 || 2,628 || 20.7 || 4.7 || 1.7 || 9.5 || align=center|
|-
|align="left"| || align="center"|F/C || align="left"|Eau Claire HS (SC) || align="center"|2 || align="center"|– || 49 || 1,001 || 223 || 22 || 254 || 20.4 || 4.6 || 0.4 || 5.2 || align=center|
|-
|align="left" bgcolor="#FFFF99"|^ || align="center"|C || align="left"|LSU || align="center"|1 || align="center"| || 37 || 752 || 178 || 26 || 341 || 20.3 || 4.8 || 0.7 || 9.2 || align=center|
|-
|align="left"| || align="center"|G || align="left"|La Salle || align="center"|2 || align="center"|– || 55 || 576 || 48 || 72 || 190 || 10.5 || 0.9 || 1.3 || 3.5 || align=center|
|-
|align="left"| || align="center"|G || align="left"|Colorado State || align="center"|2 || align="center"|– || 99 || 1,659 || 152 || 205 || 494 || 16.8 || 1.5 || 2.1 || 5.0 || align=center|
|-
|align="left"| || align="center"|G/F || align="left"|Holy Cross || align="center"|3 || align="center"|– || 137 || 1,440 || 403 || 80 || 727 || 10.5 || 2.9 || 0.6 || 5.3 || align=center|
|-
|align="left" bgcolor="#FFFF99"|^ (#00) || align="center"|C || align="left"|Centenary || align="center"|14 || align="center"|– || 1,106 || 34,977 || 11,051 || 1,679 || 18,245 || 31.6 || 10.0 || 1.5 || 16.5 || align=center|
|-
|align="left"| || align="center"|G/F || align="left"| Budućnost || align="center"|2 || align="center"|– || 62 || 676 || 86 || 21 || 151 || 10.9 || 1.4 || 0.3 || 2.4 || align=center|
|-
|align="left"| || align="center"|G/F || align="left"|Dayton || align="center"|3 || align="center"|– || 157 || 2,959 || 178 || 293 || 1,196 || 18.8 || 1.1 || 1.9 || 7.6 || align=center|
|-
|align="left" bgcolor="#FFFF99"|^ || align="center"|G || align="left"|Oregon State || align="center"|1 || align="center"| || 77 || 2,541 || 236 || 469 || 873 || 33.0 || 3.1 || 6.1 || 11.3 || align=center|
|-
|align="left"| || align="center"|C || align="left"|Beaumont HS (TX) || align="center"|8 || align="center"|– || 454 || 10,123 || 2,751 || 457 || 2,917 || 22.3 || 6.1 || 1.0 || 6.4 || align=center|
|-
|align="left" bgcolor="#FFFF99"|^ || align="center"|G/F || align="left"|Illinois || align="center"|2 || align="center"|– || 137 || 2,640 || 339 || 289 || 534 || 19.3 || 2.5 || 2.1 || 3.9 || align=center|
|-
|align="left"| || align="center"|G || align="left"|Houston || align="center"|1 || align="center"| || 67 || 713 || 107 || 64 || 270 || 10.6 || 1.6 || 1.0 || 4.0 || align=center|
|-
|align="left" bgcolor="#FFCC00"|+ (#34) || align="center"|G/F || align="left"|Kansas || align="center"|15 || align="center"|– || 1,102 || 40,360 || 6,651 || 4,305 || 24,021 || 36.6 || 6.0 || 3.9 || 21.8 || align=center|
|-
|align="left"| || align="center"|G/F || align="left"| Élan Béarnais || align="center"|1 || align="center"| || 42 || 921 || 130 || 25 || 289 || 21.9 || 3.1 || 0.6 || 6.9 || align=center|
|-
|align="left"| || align="center"|F || align="left"|Villanova || align="center"|6 || align="center"|– || 340 || 6,517 || 1,799 || 282 || 2,060 || 19.2 || 5.3 || 0.8 || 6.1 || align=center|
|-
|align="left"| || align="center"|F || align="left"|Nevada || align="center"|1 || align="center"| || 6 || 100 || 15 || 5 || 31 || 16.7 || 2.5 || 0.8 || 5.2 || align=center|
|-
|align="left"| || align="center"|C || align="left"|Kansas || align="center"|1 || align="center"| || 22 || 173 || 37 || 3 || 39 || 7.9 || 1.7 || 0.1 || 1.8 || align=center|
|-
|align="left"| || align="center"|F/C || align="left"|North Carolina || align="center"|1 || align="center"| || 19 || 64 || 14 || 2 || 35 || 3.4 || 0.7 || 0.1 || 1.8 || align=center|
|-
|align="left"| || align="center"|G/F || align="left"|Xavier || align="center"|1 || align="center"| || 74 || 1,821 || 322 || 114 || 545 || 24.6 || 4.4 || 1.5 || 7.4 || align=center|
|-
|align="left"| || align="center"|C || align="left"|Wright State || align="center"|4 || align="center"|– || 273 || 5,968 || 1,579 || 230 || 2,053 || 21.9 || 5.8 || 0.8 || 7.5 || align=center|
|-
|align="left"| || align="center"|F || align="left"|California || align="center"|3 || align="center"|– || 189 || 2,756 || 787 || 71 || 1,247 || 14.6 || 4.2 || 0.4 || 6.6 || align=center|
|-
|align="left"| || align="center"|F/C || align="left"|Stanford || align="center"|1 || align="center"| || 5 || 9 || 1 || 0 || 9 || 1.8 || 0.2 || 0.0 || 1.8 || align=center|
|-
|align="left"| || align="center"|G || align="left"|Missouri || align="center"|2 || align="center"|– || 125 || 1,732 || 185 || 358 || 390 || 13.9 || 1.5 || 2.9 || 3.1 || align=center|
|-
|align="left"| || align="center"|F || align="left"|Kentucky || align="center"|1 || align="center"| || 9 || 198 || 30 || 18 || 76 || 22.0 || 3.3 || 2.0 || 8.4 || align=center|
|-
|align="left"| || align="center"|G || align="left"|Kansas || align="center"|1 || align="center"| || 11 || 136 || 11 || 30 || 46 || 12.4 || 1.0 || 2.7 || 4.2 || align=center|
|-
|align="left"| || align="center"|G || align="left"|USC || align="center"|2 || align="center"|– || 62 || 461 || 51 || 52 || 125 || 7.4 || 0.8 || 0.8 || 2.0 || align=center|
|}

R

|-
|align="left" bgcolor="#FFFF99"|^ || align="center"|F/C || align="left"| Split || align="center"|4 || align="center"|– || 224 || 7,308 || 1,883 || 356 || 3,733 || 32.6 || 8.4 || 1.6 || 16.7 || align=center|
|-
|align="left" bgcolor="#FFFF99"|^ (#23)|| align="center"|G/F || align="left"|Kentucky || align="center"|9 || align="center"|– || 623 || 15,330 || 3,410 || 1,134 || 8,378 || 24.6 || 5.5 || 1.8 || 13.4 || align=center|
|-
|align="left"| || align="center"|F || align="left"|Duke || align="center"|2 || align="center"| || 21 || 223 || 82 || 5 || 74 || 10.6 || 3.9 || 0.2 || 3.5 || align=center|
|-
|align="left"| || align="center"|F/C || align="left"|Wyoming || align="center"|1 || align="center"| || 2 || 44 || 7 || 0 || 5 || 22.0 || 3.5 || 0.0 || 2.5 || align=center|
|-
|align="left"| || align="center"|G || align="left"|Villanova || align="center"|1 || align="center"| || 47 || 710 || 69 || 43 || 290 || 15.1 || 1.5 || 0.9 || 6.2 || align=center|
|-
|align="left"| || align="center"|F || align="left"|Ole Miss || align="center"|2 || align="center"|– || 55 || 412 || 45 || 17 || 116 || 7.5 || 0.8 || 0.3 || 2.1 || align=center|
|-
|align="left"| || align="center"|F || align="left"|NC State || align="center"|1 || align="center"| || 66 || 808 || 312 || 27 || 285 || 12.2 || 4.7 || 0.4 || 4.3 || align=center|
|-
|align="left"| || align="center"|G/F || align="left"|Wooster || align="center"|2 || align="center"|– || 81 ||  ||  || 136 || 851 ||  ||  || 1.7 || 10.5 || align=center|
|-
|align="left"| || align="center"|C || align="left"|Michigan || align="center"|1 || align="center"| || 35 || 337 || 99 || 13 || 78 || 9.6 || 2.8 || 0.4 || 2.2 || align=center|
|-
|align="left" bgcolor="#FFFF99"|^ || align="center"|F/C || align="left"|Ohio State || align="center"|3 || align="center"|– || 174 || 3,651 || 1,199 || 191 || 1,274 || 21.0 || 6.9 || 1.1 || 7.3 || align=center|
|-
|align="left"| || align="center"|F/C || align="left"|Temple || align="center"|1 || align="center"| || 28 || 91 || 24 || 3 || 40 || 3.3 || 0.9 || 0.1 || 1.4 || align=center|
|-
|align="left"| || align="center"|C || align="left"|Wyoming || align="center"|1 || align="center"| || 26 ||  ||  || 13 || 81 ||  ||  || 0.5 || 3.1 || align=center|
|-
|align="left"| || align="center"|F/C || align="left"|BYU || align="center"|2 || align="center"|– || 147 || 2,111 || 352 || 143 || 852 || 14.4 || 2.4 || 1.0 || 5.8 || align=center|
|-
|align="left"| || align="center"|F/C || align="left"|Kentucky || align="center"|5 || align="center"|– || 339 || 6,442 || 1,693 || 430 || 2,829 || 19.0 || 5.0 || 1.3 || 8.3 || align=center|
|-
|align="left"| || align="center"|G/F || align="left"|Centenary || align="center"|1 || align="center"| || 1 || 6 || 2 || 1 || 2 || 6.0 || 2.0 || 1.0 || 2.0 || align=center|
|-
|align="left"| || align="center"|G || align="left"|Washington || align="center"|2 || align="center"|– || 81 || 1,365 || 127 || 156 || 558 || 16.9 || 1.6 || 1.9 || 6.9 || align=center|
|-
|align="left"| || align="center"|F || align="left"|Wake Forest || align="center"|1 || align="center"| || 27 || 626 || 107 || 40 || 288 || 23.2 || 4.0 || 1.5 || 10.7 || align=center|
|-
|align="left"| || align="center"|F || align="left"|Alabama || align="center"|1 || align="center"| || 9 || 37 || 5 || 1 || 7 || 4.1 || 0.6 || 0.1 || 0.8 || align=center|
|-
|align="left"| || align="center"|G || align="left"|Kentucky || align="center"|1 || align="center"| || 43 || 426 || 45 || 46 || 98 || 9.9 || 1.0 || 1.1 || 2.3 || align=center|
|-
|align="left" bgcolor="#FFCC00"|+ || align="center"|G || align="left"|Kentucky || align="center"|9 || align="center"|– || 527 || 17,346 || 2,485 || 4,474 || 5,783 || 32.9 || 4.7 || bgcolor="#CFECEC"|8.5 || 11.0 || align=center|
|-
|align="left"| || align="center"|F || align="left"|UCLA || align="center"|3 || align="center"|– || 183 || 4,323 || 1,008 || 221 || 1,466 || 23.6 || 5.5 || 1.2 || 8.0 || align=center|
|-
|align="left"| || align="center"|G || align="left"|Louisville || align="center"|4 || align="center"|– || 272 || 5,433 || 973 || 631 || 2,090 || 20.0 || 3.6 || 2.3 || 7.7 || align=center|
|-
|align="left" bgcolor="#FFFF99"|^ (#6) || align="center"|C || align="left"|San Francisco || align="center"|13 || align="center"|– || 963 || 40,726 || bgcolor="#CFECEC"|21,620 || 4,100 || 14,522 || bgcolor="#CFECEC"|42.3 || bgcolor="#CFECEC"|22.5 || 4.3 || 15.1 || align=center|
|}

S

|-
|align="left"| || align="center"|C || align="left"|Seton Hall || align="center"|1 || align="center"| || 47 ||  ||  || 74 || 910 ||  ||  || 1.6 || 19.4 || align=center|
|-
|align="left"| || align="center"|G || align="left"|Wyoming || align="center"|1 || align="center"| || 10 ||  || 3 || 8 || 18 ||  || 0.3 || 0.8 || 1.8 || align=center|
|-
|align="left"| || align="center"|G/F || align="left"|Southern || align="center"|1 || align="center"| || 24 || 216 || 51 || 17 || 132 || 9.0 || 2.1 || 0.7 || 5.5 || align=center|
|-
|align="left" bgcolor="#FFFF99"|^ (#16) || align="center"|F || align="left"|NYU || align="center"|13 || align="center"|– || 916 || 22,164 || 5,798 || 1,026 || 8,766 || 24.2 || 6.3 || 1.1 || 9.6 || align=center|
|-
|align="left"| || align="center"|F/C || align="left"|Texas Southern || align="center"|1 || align="center"| || 39 || 530 || 142 || 15 || 171 || 13.6 || 3.6 || 0.4 || 4.4 || align=center|
|-
|align="left"| || align="center"|F || align="left"|Syracuse || align="center"|2 || align="center"|– || 94 || 1,294 || 260 || 96 || 477 || 13.8 || 2.8 || 1.0 || 5.1 || align=center|
|-
|align="left"| || align="center"|F || align="left"|USC || align="center"|5 || align="center"|– || 264 || 3,453 || 396 || 195 || 723 || 13.1 || 1.5 || 0.7 || 2.7 || align=center|
|-
|align="left"| || align="center"|C || align="left"|Florida || align="center"|1 || align="center"| || 16 || 67 || 19 || 8 || 11 || 4.2 || 1.2 || 0.5 || 0.7 || align=center|
|-
|align="left"| || align="center"|G || align="left"|San Francisco || align="center"|1 || align="center"| || 59 || 619 || 77 || 93 || 191 || 10.5 || 1.3 || 1.6 || 3.2 || align=center|
|-
|align="left" bgcolor="#FFFF99"|^ || align="center"|G/F || align="left"|North Carolina || align="center"|3 || align="center"|– || 156 || 5,574 || 650 || 680 || 2,728 || 35.7 || 4.2 || 4.4 || 17.5 || align=center|
|-
|align="left"| || align="center"|F || align="left"|St. John's || align="center"|1 || align="center"| || 4 || 12 || 0 || 1 || 6 || 3.0 || 0.0 || 0.3 || 1.5 || align=center|
|-
|align="left"| || align="center"|G/F || align="left"|USC || align="center"|2 || align="center"|– || 123 ||  ||  || 478 || 769 ||  ||  || 3.9 || 6.3 || align=center|
|-
|align="left"| || align="center"|G/F || align="left"|Rhode Island || align="center"|1 || align="center"| || 5 ||  ||  || 4 || 5 ||  ||  || 0.8 || 1.0 || align=center|
|-
|align="left"| || align="center"|G/F || align="left"|Kansas State || align="center"|1 || align="center"| || 67 ||  ||  || 174 || 587 ||  ||  || 2.6 || 8.8 || align=center|
|-
|align="left" bgcolor="#FFFF99"|^ (#21) || align="center"|G || align="left"|USC || align="center"|10 || align="center"|– || 680 || 21,793 || 2,683 || 2,062 || 12,287 || 32.0 || 3.9 || 3.0 || 18.1 || align=center|
|-
|align="left"| || align="center"|G || align="left"|UC Santa Barbara || align="center"|3 || align="center"|– || 178 || 5,509 || 815 || 1,163 || 1,969 || 30.9 || 4.6 || 6.5 || 11.1 || align=center|
|-
|align="left"| || align="center"|G || align="left"|Purdue || align="center"|3 || align="center"|– || 184 || 3,532 || 216 || 435 || 1,083 || 19.2 || 1.2 || 2.4 || 5.9 || align=center|
|-
|align="left"| || align="center"|F || align="left"|Ohio State || align="center"|7 || align="center"|– || 466 || 11,401 || 1,318 || 1,532 || 5,420 || 24.5 || 2.8 || 3.3 || 11.6 || align=center|
|-
|align="left" bgcolor="#FFCC00"|+ || align="center"|F/C || align="left"|Creighton || align="center"|4 || align="center"|– || 325 || 10,540 || 4,004 || 864 || 3,744 || 32.4 || 12.3 || 2.7 || 11.5 || align=center|
|-
|align="left"| || align="center"|G || align="left"|Northern Illinois || align="center"|1 || align="center"| || 2 || 7 || 2 || 0 || 0 || 3.5 || 1.0 || 0.0 || 0.0 || align=center|
|-
|align="left"| || align="center"|F/C || align="left"|Flushing HS (NY) || align="center"|2 || align="center"|– || 92 ||  ||  || 79 || 868 ||  ||  || 0.9 || 9.4 || align=center|
|-
|align="left"| || align="center"|G || align="left"|NYU || align="center"|1 || align="center"| || 60 ||  ||  || 29 || 318 ||  ||  || 0.5 || 5.3 || align=center|
|-
|align="left" bgcolor="#CCFFCC"|x || align="center"|G || align="left"|Oklahoma State || align="center"|5 || align="center"|– || 341 || 9,688 || 1,205 || 1,337 || 3,174 || 28.4 || 3.5 || 3.9 || 9.3 || align=center|
|-
|align="left"| || align="center"|G || align="left"|Georgetown || align="center"|2 || align="center"|– || 65 || 549 || 71 || 109 || 180 || 8.4 || 1.1 || 1.7 || 2.8 || align=center|
|-
|align="left"| || align="center"|G/F || align="left"|Louisville || align="center"|1 || align="center"| || 2 || 16 || 0 || 5 || 5 || 8.0 || 0.0 || 2.5 || 2.5 || align=center|
|-
|align="left"| || align="center"|F || align="left"|Missouri || align="center"|1 || align="center"| || 17 || 92 || 22 || 4 || 33 || 5.4 || 1.3 || 0.2 || 1.9 || align=center|
|-
|align="left"| || align="center"|F/C || align="left"|Eastern Kentucky || align="center"|2 || align="center"|– || 63 || 415 || 132 || 17 || 168 || 6.6 || 2.1 || 0.3 || 2.7 || align=center|
|-
|align="left"| || align="center"|F || align="left"|BYU || align="center"|2 || align="center"|– || 112 || 1,009 || 156 || 122 || 545 || 9.0 || 1.4 || 1.1 || 4.9 || align=center|
|-
|align="left"| || align="center"|F || align="left"|Villanova || align="center"|4 || align="center"|– || 169 ||  ||  || 143 || 852 ||  ||  || 0.8 || 5.0 || align=center|
|-
|align="left"| || align="center"|G || align="left"|Providence || align="center"|5 || align="center"|– || 296 || 3,878 || 443 || 440 || 1,568 || 13.1 || 1.5 || 1.5 || 5.3 || align=center|
|-
|align="left"| || align="center"|F || align="left"| || align="center"|1 || align="center"| || 19 ||  || 36 || 7 || 60 ||  || 1.9 || 0.4 || 3.2 || align=center|
|-
|align="left"| || align="center"|C || align="left"|California || align="center"|1 || align="center"| || 17 || 71 || 11 || 0 || 5 || 4.2 || 0.6 || 0.0 || 0.3 || align=center|
|-
|align="left"| || align="center"|C || align="left"|Wisconsin || align="center"|1 || align="center"| || 55 || 766 || 177 || 28 || 161 || 13.9 || 3.2 || 0.5 || 2.9 || align=center|
|-
|align="left"| || align="center"|G || align="left"|Virginia || align="center"|1 || align="center"| || 78 || 2,504 || 284 || 168 || 756 || 32.1 || 3.6 || 2.2 || 9.7 || align=center|
|-
|align="left"| || align="center"|G || align="left"|Nebraska || align="center"|1 || align="center"| || 79 || 1,643 || 213 || 184 || 606 || 20.8 || 2.7 || 2.3 || 7.7 || align=center|
|-
|align="left"| || align="center"|F || align="left"|Xavier || align="center"|1 || align="center"| || 70 || 1,344 || 375 || 44 || 441 || 19.2 || 5.4 || 0.6 || 6.3 || align=center|
|-
|align="left"| || align="center"|G/F || align="left"|DePaul || align="center"|2 || align="center"|– || 99 ||  ||  || 74 || 620 ||  ||  || 0.7 || 6.3 || align=center|
|-
|align="left"| || align="center"|F || align="left"|Ohio State || align="center"|4 || align="center"|– || 258 || 6,414 || 1,979 || 474 || 2,856 || 24.9 || 7.7 || 1.8 || 11.1 || align=center|
|-
|align="left"| || align="center"|C || align="left"| Split || align="center"|1 || align="center"| || 26 || 138 || 28 || 7 || 32 || 5.3 || 1.1 || 0.3 || 1.2 || align=center|
|-
|align="left"| || align="center"|F || align="left"|Texas Southern || align="center"|1 || align="center"| || 58 || 708 || 262 || 29 || 265 || 12.2 || 4.5 || 0.5 || 4.6 || align=center|
|-
|align="left"| || align="center"|F || align="left"|Morehead State || align="center"|1 || align="center"| || 39 || 335 || 88 || 21 || 175 || 8.6 || 2.3 || 0.5 || 4.5 || align=center|
|-
|align="left"| || align="center"|F || align="left"|Xavier || align="center"|1 || align="center"| || 1 || 2 || 2 || 0 || 0 || 2.0 || 2.0 || 0.0 || 0.0 || align=center|
|-
|align="left"| || align="center"|C || align="left"|Augustana University || align="center"|1 || align="center"| || 70 || 662 || 165 || 17 || 153 || 9.5 || 2.4 || 0.2 || 2.2 || align=center|
|-
|align="left"| || align="center"|F || align="left"|Miami (OH) || align="center"|2 || align="center"|– || 64 || 2,074 || 221 || 156 || 1,040 || 32.4 || 3.5 || 2.4 || 16.3 || align=center|
|}

T to V

|-
|align="left"| || align="center"|C || align="left"| Split || align="center"|1 || align="center"| || 18 || 232 || 58 || 12 || 59 || 12.9 || 3.2 || 0.7 || 3.3 || align=center|
|-
|align="left"| || align="center"|G/F || align="left"|Marquette || align="center"|1 || align="center"| || 3 || 38 || 4 || 1 || 20 || 12.7 || 1.3 || 0.3 || 6.7 || align=center|
|-
|align="left" bgcolor="#CCFFCC"|x || align="center"|F || align="left"|Duke || align="center"|2 || align="center"|– || 159 || 4,893 || 879 || 296 || 2,355 || 30.8 || 5.5 || 1.9 || 14.8 || align=center|
|-
|align="left"| || align="center"|G || align="left"|Abraham Lincoln HS (NY) || align="center"|1 || align="center"| || 78 || 1,578 || 108 || 218 || 479 || 20.2 || 1.4 || 2.8 || 6.1 || align=center|
|-
|align="left"| || align="center"|G || align="left"|Arizona || align="center"|1 || align="center"| || 79 || 2,124 || 159 || 198 || 799 || 26.9 || 2.0 || 2.5 || 10.1 || align=center|
|-
|align="left"| || align="center"|G/F || align="left"|Cincinnati || align="center"|1 || align="center"| || 65 || 782 || 161 || 69 || 271 || 12.0 || 2.5 || 1.1 || 4.2 || align=center|
|-
|align="left" bgcolor="#CCFFCC"|x || align="center"|C || align="left"| ratiopharm Ulm || align="center"|2 || align="center"|– || 129 || 1,844 || 499 || 124 || 705 || 14.3 || 3.9 || 1.0 || 5.5 || align=center|
|-
|align="left"| || align="center"|G/F || align="left"|Bradley || align="center"|2 || align="center"|– || 66 || 474 || 89 || 17 || 188 || 7.2 || 1.3 || 0.3 || 2.8 || align=center|
|-
|align="left" bgcolor="#FFCC00"|+ || align="center"|G || align="left"|Washington || align="center"|3 || align="center"|– || 179 || 5,758 || 492 || 1,070 || 4,422 || 32.2 || 2.7 || 6.0 || bgcolor="#CFECEC"|24.7 || align=center|
|-
|align="left"| || align="center"|F || align="left"|Providence || align="center"|1 || align="center"| || 3 || 19 || 2 || 2 || 11 || 6.3 || 0.7 || 0.7 || 3.7 || align=center|
|-
|align="left"| || align="center"|F || align="left"|Minnesota || align="center"|1 || align="center"| || 33 || 368 || 70 || 13 || 108 || 11.2 || 2.1 || 0.4 || 3.3 || align=center|
|-
|align="left" bgcolor="#FFFF99"|^ || align="center"|F || align="left"|Providence || align="center"|2 || align="center"|– || 74 || 771 || 260 || 19 || 262 || 10.4 || 3.5 || 0.3 || 3.5 || align=center|
|-
|align="left"| || align="center"|G || align="left"|LSU || align="center"|1 || align="center"| || 39 || 640 || 73 || 34 || 348 || 16.4 || 1.9 || 0.9 || 8.9 || align=center|
|-
|align="left"| || align="center"|F/C || align="left"|Cleveland State || align="center"|1 || align="center"| || 15 || 44 || 9 || 2 || 16 || 2.9 || 0.6 || 0.1 || 1.1 || align=center|
|-
|align="left"| || align="center"|F || align="left"|Kentucky || align="center"|3 || align="center"|– || 157 || 2,977 || 751 || 165 || 910 || 19.0 || 4.8 || 1.1 || 5.8 || align=center|
|-
|align="left"| || align="center"|G || align="left"|Memphis || align="center"|1 || align="center"| || 3 || 18 || 2 || 1 || 4 || 6.0 || 0.7 || 0.3 || 1.3 || align=center|
|-
|align="left"| || align="center"|G || align="left"|Ohio State || align="center"|2 || align="center"|– || 163 || 4,531 || 814 || 808 || 1,633 || 27.8 || 5.0 || 5.0 || 10.0 || align=center|
|-
|align="left"| || align="center"|G || align="left"|Kentucky || align="center"|1 || align="center"| || 3 || 41 || 3 || 5 || 4 || 13.7 || 1.0 || 1.7 || 1.3 || align=center|
|-
|align="left"| || align="center"|G || align="left"|Utah || align="center"|2 || align="center"|– || 37 || 604 || 49 || 125 || 192 || 16.3 || 1.3 || 3.4 || 5.2 || align=center|
|-
|align="left"| || align="center"|F || align="left"|Mississippi State || align="center"|1 || align="center"| || 5 || 18 || 3 || 1 || 6 || 3.6 || 0.6 || 0.2 || 1.2 || align=center|
|-
|align="left"| || align="center"|F/C || align="left"|Western Kentucky || align="center"|1 || align="center"| || 17 ||  ||  || 10 || 45 ||  ||  || 0.6 || 2.6 || align=center|
|-
|align="left"| || align="center"|G || align="left"|Michigan State || align="center"|2 || align="center"|– || 103 || 806 || 75 || 128 || 355 || 7.8 || 0.7 || 1.2 || 3.4 || align=center|
|-
|align="left"| || align="center"|C || align="left"| Zadar || align="center"|2 || align="center"|– || 50 || 276 || 79 || 9 || 95 || 5.5 || 1.6 || 0.2 || 1.9 || align=center|
|}

W to Y

|-
|align="left"| || align="center"|G || align="left"|Florida State || align="center"|1 || align="center"| || 58 || 553 || 49 || 35 || 184 || 9.5 || 0.8 || 0.6 || 3.2 || align=center|
|-
|align="left" bgcolor="#FFCC00"|+ || align="center"|F || align="left"|Kentucky || align="center"|8 || align="center"|– || 552 || 21,654 || 4,782 || 2,266 || 11,386 || 39.2 || 8.7 || 4.1 || 20.6 || align=center|
|-
|align="left"| || align="center"|F/C || align="left"|BYU || align="center"|2 || align="center"|– || 85 ||  || 31 || 117 || 539 ||  || 1.8 || 1.4 || 6.3 || align=center|
|-
|align="left"| || align="center"|F || align="left"|Kansas State || align="center"|2 || align="center"|– || 37 || 245 || 34 || 16 || 96 || 6.6 || 0.9 || 0.4 || 2.6 || align=center|
|-
|align="left"| || align="center"|F || align="left"|Alabama || align="center"|2 || align="center"|– || 90 || 1,702 || 269 || 154 || 333 || 18.9 || 3.0 || 1.7 || 3.7 || align=center|
|-
|align="left"| || align="center"|F/C || align="left"|North Carolina || align="center"|1 || align="center"| || 79 || 1,780 || 325 || 80 || 710 || 22.5 || 4.1 || 1.0 || 9.0 || align=center|
|-
|align="left"| || align="center"|G || align="left"|Scranton || align="center"|1 || align="center"| || 24 ||  ||  || 20 || 131 ||  ||  || 0.8 || 5.5 || align=center|
|-
|align="left" bgcolor="#FFFF99"|^ || align="center"|F/C || align="left"|UCLA || align="center"|2 || align="center"|– || 90 || 1,658 || 575 || 174 || 634 || 18.4 || 6.4 || 1.9 || 7.0 || align=center|
|-
|align="left" bgcolor="#CCFFCC"|x || align="center"|G || align="left"|Pittsburgh || align="center"|1 || align="center"| || 36 || 343 || 41 || 56 || 140 || 9.5 || 1.1 || 1.6 || 3.9 || align=center|
|-
|align="left"| || align="center"|G || align="left"|Boston College || align="center"|1 || align="center"| || 3 || 30 || 5 || 6 || 5 || 10.0 || 1.7 || 2.0 || 1.7 || align=center|
|-
|align="left"| || align="center"|F/C || align="left"|American || align="center"|1 || align="center"| || 32 || 866 || 335 || 42 || 376 || 27.1 || 10.5 || 1.3 || 11.8 || align=center|
|-
|align="left"| || align="center"|F || align="left"|Wake Forest || align="center"|2 || align="center"|– || 28 || 92 || 39 || 2 || 40 || 3.3 || 1.4 || 0.1 || 1.4 || align=center|
|-
|align="left"| || align="center"|F/C || align="left"|Alabama || align="center"|1 || align="center"| || 9 || 51 || 10 || 2 || 39 || 5.7 || 1.1 || 0.2 || 4.3 || align=center|
|-
|align="left"| || align="center"|G/F || align="left"|Colorado || align="center"|5 || align="center"|– || 271 || 4,026 || 573 || 281 || 1,689 || 14.9 || 2.1 || 1.0 || 6.2 || align=center|
|-
|align="left"| || align="center"|G || align="left"|Northeastern || align="center"|1 || align="center"| || 25 || 75 || 10 || 8 || 33 || 3.0 || 0.4 || 0.3 || 1.3 || align=center|
|-
|align="left"| || align="center"|G || align="left"| Olimpija || align="center"|2 || align="center"|– || 136 || 3,304 || 435 || 267 || 1,161 || 24.3 || 3.2 || 2.0 || 8.5 || align=center|
|-
|align="left"| || align="center"|C || align="left"|North Carolina || align="center"|1 || align="center"| || 11 || 37 || 12 || 0 || 18 || 3.4 || 1.1 || 0.0 || 1.6 || align=center|
|-
|align="left"| || align="center"|G || align="left"|Baylor || align="center"|3 || align="center"|– || 207 || 6,475 || 645 || 1,193 || 2,627 || 31.3 || 3.1 || 5.8 || 12.7 || align=center|
|-
|align="left"| || align="center"|G || align="left"|Saint Joseph's || align="center"|4 || align="center"|– || 203 || 5,597 || 599 || 750 || 1,991 || 27.6 || 3.0 || 3.7 || 9.8 || align=center|
|-
|align="left" bgcolor="#FFFF99"|^ || align="center"|G || align="left"|USC || align="center"|3 || align="center"|– || 224 || 3,228 || 373 || 475 || 1,636 || 14.4 || 1.7 || 2.1 || 7.3 || align=center|
|-
|align="left"| || align="center"|G || align="left"|Kentucky || align="center"|1 || align="center"| || 3 || 15 || 1 || 1 || 2 || 5.0 || 0.3 || 0.3 || 0.7 || align=center|
|-
|align="left"| || align="center"|F || align="left"|Indiana || align="center"|1 || align="center"| || 12 || 86 || 13 || 4 || 29 || 7.2 || 1.1 || 0.3 || 2.4 || align=center|
|-
|align="left" bgcolor="#FFFF99"|^ (#10)''' || align="center"|G || align="left"|Kansas || align="center"|10 || align="center"|– || 717 || 26,770 || 3,071 || 3,686 || 13,188 || 37.3 || 4.3 || 5.1 || 18.4 || align=center|
|-
|align="left"| || align="center"|F/C || align="left"|UCLA || align="center"|2 || align="center"|– || 163 || 5,055 || 1,497 || 340 || 2,321 || 31.0 || 9.2 || 2.1 || 14.2 || align=center|
|-
|align="left"| || align="center"|F || align="left"|Maryland || align="center"|2 || align="center"|– || 89 || 1,311 || 302 || 34 || 411 || 14.7 || 3.4 || 0.4 || 4.6 || align=center|
|-
|align="left" bgcolor="#FFFF99"|^ || align="center"|G/F || align="left"|Georgia || align="center"|1 || align="center"| || 77 || 2,423 || 401 || 166 || 1,370 || 31.5 || 5.2 || 2.2 || 17.8 || align=center|
|-
|align="left"| || align="center"|G || align="left"|Cal Poly Pomona || align="center"|4 || align="center"|– || 303 || 4,058 || 758 || 959 || 1,208 || 13.4 || 2.5 || 3.2 || 4.0 || align=center|
|-
|align="left"| || align="center"|F/C || align="left"|Winston-Salem State || align="center"|1 || align="center"| || 20 || 273 || 105 || 12 || 122 || 13.7 || 5.3 || 0.6 || 6.1 || align=center|
|-
|align="left"| || align="center"|F || align="left"|Providence || align="center"|7 || align="center"|–– || 462 || 11,638 || 1,607 || 678 || 4,248 || 25.2 || 3.5 || 1.5 || 9.2 || align=center|
|-
|align="left"| || align="center"|F/C || align="left"|Stetson || align="center"|1 || align="center"| || 22 || 151 || 44 || 5 || 34 || 6.9 || 2.0 || 0.2 || 1.5 || align=center|
|-
|align="left"| || align="center"|G || align="left"|Minnesota || align="center"|1 || align="center"| || 23 || 459 || 57 || 90 || 147 || 20.0 || 2.5 || 3.9 || 6.4 || align=center|
|-
|align="left" bgcolor="#CCFFCC"|x || align="center"|F || align="left"|Texas A&M || align="center"|1 || align="center"| || 32 || 283 || 81 || 7 || 81 || 8.8 || 2.5 || 0.2 || 2.5 || align=center|
|-
|align="left"| || align="center"|F/C || align="left"|Boston College || align="center"|1 || align="center"| || 3 || 42 || 12 || 3 || 11 || 14.0 || 4.0 || 1.0 || 3.7 || align=center|
|-
|align="left"| || align="center"|G || align="left"|North Carolina || align="center"|1 || align="center"| || 51 || 1,169 || 110 || 128 || 372 || 22.9 || 2.2 || 2.5 || 7.3 || align=center|
|-
|align="left"| || align="center"|F || align="left"|Duke || align="center"|1 || align="center"| || 54 || 597 || 146 || 21 || 201 || 11.1 || 2.7 || 0.4 || 3.7 || align=center|
|-
|align="left"| || align="center"|G/F || align="left"|Rhode Island || align="center"|1 || align="center"| || 6 || 54 || 15 || 2 || 17 || 9.0 || 2.5 || 0.3 || 2.8 || align=center|
|-
|align="left"| || align="center"|F || align="left"|Louisville || align="center"|1 || align="center"| || 24 || 318 || 44 || 38 || 110 || 13.3 || 1.8 || 1.6 || 4.6 || align=center|
|-
|align="left"| || align="center"|F || align="left"|Florida State || align="center"|1 || align="center"| || 16 || 56 || 10 || 2 || 15 || 3.5 || 0.6 || 0.1 || 0.9 || align=center|
|-
|align="left"| || align="center"|F || align="left"|Kansas || align="center"|1 || align="center"| || 25 || 131 || 9 || 14 || 49 || 5.2 || 0.4 || 0.6 || 2.0 || align=center|
|-
|align="left"| || align="center"|F/C || align="left"|North Carolina || align="center"|1 || align="center"| || 2 || 9 || 3 || 0 || 1 || 4.5 || 1.5 || 0.0 || 0.5 || align=center|
|-
|align="left"| || align="center"|F || align="left"| Estudiantes de Olavarría || align="center"|1 || align="center"| || 7 || 24 || 1 || 1 || 5 || 3.4 || 0.1 || 0.1 || 0.7 || align=center|
|-
|align="left"| || align="center"|F/C || align="left"|North Carolina || align="center"|1 || align="center"| || 8 || 86 || 17 || 8 || 26 || 10.8 || 2.1 || 1.0 || 3.3 || align=center|
|-
|align="left"| || align="center"|G || align="left"|Fairfield || align="center"|1 || align="center"| || 6 || 39 || 3 || 8 || 12 || 6.5 || 0.5 || 1.3 || 2.0 || align=center|
|-
|align="left"| || align="center"|F || align="left"| Rouen Métropole || align="center"|2 || align="center"|– || 74 || 486 || 105 || 31 || 173 || 6.6 || 1.4 || 0.4 || 2.3 || align=center|
|-
|align="left"| || align="center"|G/F || align="left"|Kentucky || align="center"|3 || align="center"|– || 89 || 751 || 94 || 26 || 202 || 8.4 || 1.1 || 0.3 || 2.3 || align=center|
|-
|align="left"| || align="center"|F/C || align="left"|North Carolina || align="center"|3 || align="center"|– || 193 || 2,966 || 767 || 184 || 1,375 || 15.4 || 4.0 || 1.0 || 7.1 || align=center|
|}

See also
 Boston Celtics roster
 Boston Celtics current roster

References

External links
Boston Celtics all-time roster
2007–08 Boston Celtics Media Guide – Tradition
Boston Celtics All-Time Roster Statistics

National Basketball Association all-time rosters

roster